

351001–351100 

|-bgcolor=#fefefe
| 351001 ||  || — || April 28, 2003 || Socorro || LINEAR || — || align=right | 2.0 km || 
|-id=002 bgcolor=#fefefe
| 351002 ||  || — || April 27, 2003 || Anderson Mesa || LONEOS || — || align=right data-sort-value="0.82" | 820 m || 
|-id=003 bgcolor=#fefefe
| 351003 || 2003 JC || — || May 1, 2003 || Kitt Peak || Spacewatch || H || align=right data-sort-value="0.75" | 750 m || 
|-id=004 bgcolor=#fefefe
| 351004 ||  || — || May 3, 2003 || Haleakala || NEAT || PHO || align=right | 1.1 km || 
|-id=005 bgcolor=#fefefe
| 351005 ||  || — || May 25, 2003 || Kitt Peak || Spacewatch || H || align=right data-sort-value="0.91" | 910 m || 
|-id=006 bgcolor=#d6d6d6
| 351006 ||  || — || May 23, 2003 || Kitt Peak || Spacewatch || — || align=right | 2.7 km || 
|-id=007 bgcolor=#E9E9E9
| 351007 ||  || — || June 21, 2003 || Anderson Mesa || LONEOS || — || align=right | 1.7 km || 
|-id=008 bgcolor=#E9E9E9
| 351008 ||  || — || July 24, 2003 || Palomar || NEAT || — || align=right | 1.3 km || 
|-id=009 bgcolor=#FA8072
| 351009 ||  || — || August 1, 2003 || Haleakala || NEAT || — || align=right | 1.2 km || 
|-id=010 bgcolor=#E9E9E9
| 351010 ||  || — || August 20, 2003 || Palomar || NEAT || EUN || align=right | 1.4 km || 
|-id=011 bgcolor=#E9E9E9
| 351011 ||  || — || August 22, 2003 || Socorro || LINEAR || — || align=right | 1.8 km || 
|-id=012 bgcolor=#E9E9E9
| 351012 ||  || — || August 22, 2003 || Palomar || NEAT || — || align=right | 1.0 km || 
|-id=013 bgcolor=#E9E9E9
| 351013 ||  || — || August 23, 2003 || Socorro || LINEAR || — || align=right | 1.1 km || 
|-id=014 bgcolor=#E9E9E9
| 351014 ||  || — || August 23, 2003 || Socorro || LINEAR || BRG || align=right | 1.7 km || 
|-id=015 bgcolor=#E9E9E9
| 351015 ||  || — || July 28, 2003 || Palomar || NEAT || — || align=right | 2.6 km || 
|-id=016 bgcolor=#E9E9E9
| 351016 ||  || — || August 24, 2003 || Socorro || LINEAR || — || align=right | 2.0 km || 
|-id=017 bgcolor=#E9E9E9
| 351017 ||  || — || September 3, 2003 || Haleakala || NEAT || — || align=right | 1.6 km || 
|-id=018 bgcolor=#E9E9E9
| 351018 ||  || — || September 15, 2003 || Anderson Mesa || LONEOS || — || align=right | 1.7 km || 
|-id=019 bgcolor=#E9E9E9
| 351019 ||  || — || September 15, 2003 || Anderson Mesa || LONEOS || RAF || align=right | 1.1 km || 
|-id=020 bgcolor=#E9E9E9
| 351020 ||  || — || September 17, 2003 || Palomar || NEAT || KON || align=right | 2.9 km || 
|-id=021 bgcolor=#E9E9E9
| 351021 ||  || — || September 17, 2003 || Kitt Peak || Spacewatch || — || align=right | 1.3 km || 
|-id=022 bgcolor=#E9E9E9
| 351022 ||  || — || September 2, 2003 || Socorro || LINEAR || MAR || align=right | 1.5 km || 
|-id=023 bgcolor=#E9E9E9
| 351023 ||  || — || September 16, 2003 || Palomar || NEAT || — || align=right | 2.1 km || 
|-id=024 bgcolor=#E9E9E9
| 351024 ||  || — || September 16, 2003 || Palomar || NEAT || — || align=right | 1.4 km || 
|-id=025 bgcolor=#E9E9E9
| 351025 ||  || — || September 17, 2003 || Palomar || NEAT || JUN || align=right | 1.3 km || 
|-id=026 bgcolor=#E9E9E9
| 351026 ||  || — || September 19, 2003 || Palomar || NEAT || — || align=right | 1.4 km || 
|-id=027 bgcolor=#E9E9E9
| 351027 ||  || — || September 16, 2003 || Anderson Mesa || LONEOS || — || align=right | 1.8 km || 
|-id=028 bgcolor=#E9E9E9
| 351028 ||  || — || September 19, 2003 || Kitt Peak || Spacewatch || — || align=right | 1.2 km || 
|-id=029 bgcolor=#E9E9E9
| 351029 ||  || — || September 18, 2003 || Kitt Peak || Spacewatch || — || align=right | 1.1 km || 
|-id=030 bgcolor=#E9E9E9
| 351030 ||  || — || September 20, 2003 || Palomar || NEAT || — || align=right | 3.6 km || 
|-id=031 bgcolor=#E9E9E9
| 351031 ||  || — || September 17, 2003 || Palomar || NEAT || IAN || align=right | 1.0 km || 
|-id=032 bgcolor=#E9E9E9
| 351032 ||  || — || September 19, 2003 || Socorro || LINEAR || — || align=right | 1.6 km || 
|-id=033 bgcolor=#E9E9E9
| 351033 ||  || — || September 20, 2003 || Kitt Peak || Spacewatch || BAR || align=right | 1.6 km || 
|-id=034 bgcolor=#E9E9E9
| 351034 ||  || — || September 20, 2003 || Palomar || NEAT || ADE || align=right | 2.7 km || 
|-id=035 bgcolor=#E9E9E9
| 351035 ||  || — || September 16, 2003 || Kitt Peak || Spacewatch || — || align=right | 1.5 km || 
|-id=036 bgcolor=#d6d6d6
| 351036 ||  || — || September 5, 2003 || Bergisch Gladbach || W. Bickel || Tj (2.96) || align=right | 4.8 km || 
|-id=037 bgcolor=#E9E9E9
| 351037 ||  || — || September 20, 2003 || Anderson Mesa || LONEOS || RAF || align=right | 1.1 km || 
|-id=038 bgcolor=#E9E9E9
| 351038 ||  || — || September 23, 2003 || Haleakala || NEAT || — || align=right | 1.3 km || 
|-id=039 bgcolor=#fefefe
| 351039 ||  || — || September 22, 2003 || Palomar || NEAT || — || align=right | 1.0 km || 
|-id=040 bgcolor=#E9E9E9
| 351040 ||  || — || September 22, 2003 || Piszkéstető || K. Sárneczky, B. Sipőcz || — || align=right | 1.4 km || 
|-id=041 bgcolor=#E9E9E9
| 351041 ||  || — || September 20, 2003 || Kitt Peak || Spacewatch || — || align=right | 1.0 km || 
|-id=042 bgcolor=#E9E9E9
| 351042 ||  || — || September 16, 2003 || Palomar || NEAT || ADE || align=right | 2.1 km || 
|-id=043 bgcolor=#d6d6d6
| 351043 ||  || — || September 21, 2003 || Campo Imperatore || CINEOS || HIL || align=right | 6.4 km || 
|-id=044 bgcolor=#E9E9E9
| 351044 ||  || — || September 23, 2003 || Palomar || NEAT || — || align=right | 1.4 km || 
|-id=045 bgcolor=#E9E9E9
| 351045 ||  || — || September 26, 2003 || Socorro || LINEAR || — || align=right | 1.5 km || 
|-id=046 bgcolor=#d6d6d6
| 351046 ||  || — || September 27, 2003 || Socorro || LINEAR || 3:2 || align=right | 5.2 km || 
|-id=047 bgcolor=#E9E9E9
| 351047 ||  || — || September 26, 2003 || Socorro || LINEAR || — || align=right | 1.5 km || 
|-id=048 bgcolor=#E9E9E9
| 351048 ||  || — || September 27, 2003 || Kitt Peak || Spacewatch || — || align=right | 1.3 km || 
|-id=049 bgcolor=#E9E9E9
| 351049 ||  || — || September 25, 2003 || Haleakala || NEAT || — || align=right | 1.3 km || 
|-id=050 bgcolor=#E9E9E9
| 351050 ||  || — || September 26, 2003 || Socorro || LINEAR || — || align=right | 1.1 km || 
|-id=051 bgcolor=#E9E9E9
| 351051 ||  || — || September 26, 2003 || Socorro || LINEAR || — || align=right | 1.9 km || 
|-id=052 bgcolor=#E9E9E9
| 351052 ||  || — || September 27, 2003 || Kitt Peak || Spacewatch || — || align=right | 2.2 km || 
|-id=053 bgcolor=#E9E9E9
| 351053 ||  || — || September 27, 2003 || Kitt Peak || Spacewatch || — || align=right | 1.5 km || 
|-id=054 bgcolor=#E9E9E9
| 351054 ||  || — || September 28, 2003 || Kitt Peak || Spacewatch || — || align=right | 1.7 km || 
|-id=055 bgcolor=#E9E9E9
| 351055 ||  || — || August 25, 2003 || Socorro || LINEAR || — || align=right | 2.0 km || 
|-id=056 bgcolor=#E9E9E9
| 351056 ||  || — || September 30, 2003 || Socorro || LINEAR || MAR || align=right | 1.4 km || 
|-id=057 bgcolor=#E9E9E9
| 351057 ||  || — || September 29, 2003 || Socorro || LINEAR || — || align=right | 1.6 km || 
|-id=058 bgcolor=#E9E9E9
| 351058 ||  || — || September 29, 2003 || Anderson Mesa || LONEOS || ADE || align=right | 1.5 km || 
|-id=059 bgcolor=#E9E9E9
| 351059 ||  || — || September 29, 2003 || Anderson Mesa || LONEOS || IAN || align=right | 1.0 km || 
|-id=060 bgcolor=#E9E9E9
| 351060 ||  || — || September 17, 2003 || Palomar || NEAT || — || align=right | 1.3 km || 
|-id=061 bgcolor=#fefefe
| 351061 ||  || — || September 17, 2003 || Kitt Peak || Spacewatch || — || align=right | 1.2 km || 
|-id=062 bgcolor=#E9E9E9
| 351062 ||  || — || September 26, 2003 || Apache Point || SDSS || — || align=right | 1.1 km || 
|-id=063 bgcolor=#E9E9E9
| 351063 ||  || — || September 26, 2003 || Apache Point || SDSS || — || align=right | 1.2 km || 
|-id=064 bgcolor=#E9E9E9
| 351064 ||  || — || September 26, 2003 || Apache Point || SDSS || HNS || align=right | 1.4 km || 
|-id=065 bgcolor=#E9E9E9
| 351065 ||  || — || September 27, 2003 || Apache Point || SDSS || EUN || align=right | 1.5 km || 
|-id=066 bgcolor=#fefefe
| 351066 ||  || — || September 17, 2003 || Kitt Peak || Spacewatch || — || align=right | 1.7 km || 
|-id=067 bgcolor=#E9E9E9
| 351067 ||  || — || September 30, 2003 || Kitt Peak || Spacewatch || — || align=right | 1.6 km || 
|-id=068 bgcolor=#FA8072
| 351068 ||  || — || October 5, 2003 || Kitt Peak || Spacewatch || — || align=right | 2.6 km || 
|-id=069 bgcolor=#E9E9E9
| 351069 ||  || — || October 1, 2003 || Kitt Peak || Spacewatch || EUN || align=right | 1.5 km || 
|-id=070 bgcolor=#E9E9E9
| 351070 ||  || — || October 15, 2003 || Anderson Mesa || LONEOS || — || align=right | 1.8 km || 
|-id=071 bgcolor=#fefefe
| 351071 ||  || — || October 16, 2003 || Socorro || LINEAR || H || align=right data-sort-value="0.90" | 900 m || 
|-id=072 bgcolor=#fefefe
| 351072 ||  || — || October 16, 2003 || Anderson Mesa || LONEOS || H || align=right | 1.2 km || 
|-id=073 bgcolor=#E9E9E9
| 351073 ||  || — || October 20, 2003 || Socorro || LINEAR || BAR || align=right | 1.3 km || 
|-id=074 bgcolor=#E9E9E9
| 351074 ||  || — || October 16, 2003 || Anderson Mesa || LONEOS || — || align=right | 2.0 km || 
|-id=075 bgcolor=#E9E9E9
| 351075 ||  || — || October 18, 2003 || Palomar || NEAT || — || align=right | 1.1 km || 
|-id=076 bgcolor=#E9E9E9
| 351076 ||  || — || October 18, 2003 || Palomar || NEAT || EUN || align=right | 1.2 km || 
|-id=077 bgcolor=#d6d6d6
| 351077 ||  || — || October 18, 2003 || Palomar || NEAT || HIL || align=right | 5.2 km || 
|-id=078 bgcolor=#E9E9E9
| 351078 ||  || — || October 18, 2003 || Palomar || NEAT || — || align=right | 1.6 km || 
|-id=079 bgcolor=#E9E9E9
| 351079 ||  || — || October 17, 2003 || Anderson Mesa || LONEOS || — || align=right | 1.5 km || 
|-id=080 bgcolor=#E9E9E9
| 351080 ||  || — || October 16, 2003 || Palomar || NEAT || KON || align=right | 2.8 km || 
|-id=081 bgcolor=#E9E9E9
| 351081 ||  || — || October 17, 2003 || Kitt Peak || Spacewatch || — || align=right | 1.4 km || 
|-id=082 bgcolor=#E9E9E9
| 351082 ||  || — || October 16, 2003 || Anderson Mesa || LONEOS || — || align=right | 1.2 km || 
|-id=083 bgcolor=#E9E9E9
| 351083 ||  || — || October 18, 2003 || Palomar || NEAT || — || align=right | 2.1 km || 
|-id=084 bgcolor=#E9E9E9
| 351084 ||  || — || October 18, 2003 || Palomar || NEAT || EUN || align=right | 1.5 km || 
|-id=085 bgcolor=#E9E9E9
| 351085 ||  || — || October 20, 2003 || Socorro || LINEAR || — || align=right | 2.0 km || 
|-id=086 bgcolor=#E9E9E9
| 351086 ||  || — || October 19, 2003 || Anderson Mesa || LONEOS || — || align=right | 2.1 km || 
|-id=087 bgcolor=#E9E9E9
| 351087 ||  || — || October 20, 2003 || Kitt Peak || Spacewatch || — || align=right | 1.2 km || 
|-id=088 bgcolor=#E9E9E9
| 351088 ||  || — || September 22, 2003 || Palomar || NEAT || — || align=right | 1.8 km || 
|-id=089 bgcolor=#E9E9E9
| 351089 ||  || — || October 3, 2003 || Kitt Peak || Spacewatch || — || align=right | 1.4 km || 
|-id=090 bgcolor=#E9E9E9
| 351090 ||  || — || October 21, 2003 || Kitt Peak || Spacewatch || — || align=right | 1.0 km || 
|-id=091 bgcolor=#E9E9E9
| 351091 ||  || — || October 21, 2003 || Palomar || NEAT || — || align=right data-sort-value="0.83" | 830 m || 
|-id=092 bgcolor=#E9E9E9
| 351092 ||  || — || October 21, 2003 || Kitt Peak || Spacewatch || — || align=right | 1.1 km || 
|-id=093 bgcolor=#E9E9E9
| 351093 ||  || — || October 22, 2003 || Kitt Peak || Spacewatch || — || align=right | 1.5 km || 
|-id=094 bgcolor=#E9E9E9
| 351094 ||  || — || October 22, 2003 || Socorro || LINEAR || — || align=right | 2.0 km || 
|-id=095 bgcolor=#E9E9E9
| 351095 ||  || — || October 24, 2003 || Socorro || LINEAR || — || align=right data-sort-value="0.84" | 840 m || 
|-id=096 bgcolor=#E9E9E9
| 351096 ||  || — || October 24, 2003 || Socorro || LINEAR || — || align=right | 1.5 km || 
|-id=097 bgcolor=#E9E9E9
| 351097 ||  || — || October 24, 2003 || Socorro || LINEAR || MIS || align=right | 3.5 km || 
|-id=098 bgcolor=#E9E9E9
| 351098 ||  || — || October 24, 2003 || Haleakala || NEAT || — || align=right | 2.4 km || 
|-id=099 bgcolor=#E9E9E9
| 351099 ||  || — || October 25, 2003 || Socorro || LINEAR || HNS || align=right | 1.3 km || 
|-id=100 bgcolor=#E9E9E9
| 351100 ||  || — || October 26, 2003 || Catalina || CSS || — || align=right | 2.4 km || 
|}

351101–351200 

|-bgcolor=#E9E9E9
| 351101 ||  || — || October 27, 2003 || Socorro || LINEAR || — || align=right | 1.3 km || 
|-id=102 bgcolor=#E9E9E9
| 351102 ||  || — || October 28, 2003 || Socorro || LINEAR || — || align=right | 1.9 km || 
|-id=103 bgcolor=#d6d6d6
| 351103 ||  || — || October 28, 2003 || Socorro || LINEAR || SHU3:2 || align=right | 4.7 km || 
|-id=104 bgcolor=#E9E9E9
| 351104 ||  || — || October 21, 2003 || Socorro || LINEAR || — || align=right | 2.0 km || 
|-id=105 bgcolor=#E9E9E9
| 351105 ||  || — || October 17, 2003 || Apache Point || SDSS || — || align=right data-sort-value="0.80" | 800 m || 
|-id=106 bgcolor=#E9E9E9
| 351106 ||  || — || October 16, 2003 || Palomar || NEAT || — || align=right | 1.1 km || 
|-id=107 bgcolor=#E9E9E9
| 351107 ||  || — || October 17, 2003 || Apache Point || SDSS || — || align=right | 1.6 km || 
|-id=108 bgcolor=#E9E9E9
| 351108 ||  || — || October 18, 2003 || Apache Point || SDSS || — || align=right data-sort-value="0.93" | 930 m || 
|-id=109 bgcolor=#E9E9E9
| 351109 ||  || — || October 19, 2003 || Apache Point || SDSS || — || align=right | 1.3 km || 
|-id=110 bgcolor=#E9E9E9
| 351110 ||  || — || October 19, 2003 || Apache Point || SDSS || — || align=right data-sort-value="0.98" | 980 m || 
|-id=111 bgcolor=#E9E9E9
| 351111 ||  || — || October 19, 2003 || Apache Point || SDSS || — || align=right data-sort-value="0.99" | 990 m || 
|-id=112 bgcolor=#E9E9E9
| 351112 ||  || — || October 22, 2003 || Apache Point || SDSS || BRU || align=right | 3.7 km || 
|-id=113 bgcolor=#E9E9E9
| 351113 ||  || — || October 22, 2003 || Apache Point || SDSS || — || align=right | 1.0 km || 
|-id=114 bgcolor=#E9E9E9
| 351114 ||  || — || October 22, 2003 || Kitt Peak || M. W. Buie || — || align=right data-sort-value="0.99" | 990 m || 
|-id=115 bgcolor=#E9E9E9
| 351115 ||  || — || November 14, 2003 || Palomar || NEAT || — || align=right | 2.2 km || 
|-id=116 bgcolor=#E9E9E9
| 351116 ||  || — || November 15, 2003 || Kitt Peak || Spacewatch || — || align=right | 2.2 km || 
|-id=117 bgcolor=#E9E9E9
| 351117 ||  || — || November 16, 2003 || Kitt Peak || Spacewatch || MAR || align=right | 1.4 km || 
|-id=118 bgcolor=#E9E9E9
| 351118 ||  || — || October 19, 2003 || Kitt Peak || Spacewatch || RAF || align=right data-sort-value="0.86" | 860 m || 
|-id=119 bgcolor=#E9E9E9
| 351119 ||  || — || November 18, 2003 || Palomar || NEAT || — || align=right | 3.4 km || 
|-id=120 bgcolor=#E9E9E9
| 351120 ||  || — || November 18, 2003 || Kitt Peak || Spacewatch || — || align=right | 1.4 km || 
|-id=121 bgcolor=#E9E9E9
| 351121 ||  || — || November 19, 2003 || Socorro || LINEAR || — || align=right | 3.4 km || 
|-id=122 bgcolor=#E9E9E9
| 351122 ||  || — || November 20, 2003 || Socorro || LINEAR || — || align=right | 1.8 km || 
|-id=123 bgcolor=#E9E9E9
| 351123 ||  || — || November 20, 2003 || Socorro || LINEAR || — || align=right | 2.5 km || 
|-id=124 bgcolor=#E9E9E9
| 351124 ||  || — || November 20, 2003 || Socorro || LINEAR || WIT || align=right | 1.2 km || 
|-id=125 bgcolor=#E9E9E9
| 351125 ||  || — || November 19, 2003 || Palomar || NEAT || GER || align=right | 1.8 km || 
|-id=126 bgcolor=#E9E9E9
| 351126 ||  || — || November 20, 2003 || Socorro || LINEAR || — || align=right | 3.1 km || 
|-id=127 bgcolor=#E9E9E9
| 351127 ||  || — || November 20, 2003 || Socorro || LINEAR || — || align=right | 2.8 km || 
|-id=128 bgcolor=#E9E9E9
| 351128 ||  || — || November 21, 2003 || Socorro || LINEAR || — || align=right | 1.8 km || 
|-id=129 bgcolor=#E9E9E9
| 351129 ||  || — || November 19, 2003 || Anderson Mesa || LONEOS || — || align=right | 1.4 km || 
|-id=130 bgcolor=#E9E9E9
| 351130 ||  || — || November 21, 2003 || Catalina || CSS || — || align=right | 1.6 km || 
|-id=131 bgcolor=#E9E9E9
| 351131 ||  || — || November 14, 2003 || Palomar || NEAT || — || align=right | 1.2 km || 
|-id=132 bgcolor=#E9E9E9
| 351132 ||  || — || November 20, 2003 || Socorro || LINEAR || — || align=right | 1.6 km || 
|-id=133 bgcolor=#E9E9E9
| 351133 ||  || — || November 20, 2003 || Socorro || LINEAR || INO || align=right | 1.3 km || 
|-id=134 bgcolor=#E9E9E9
| 351134 ||  || — || November 20, 2003 || Socorro || LINEAR || MAR || align=right | 1.4 km || 
|-id=135 bgcolor=#E9E9E9
| 351135 ||  || — || November 19, 2003 || Kitt Peak || Spacewatch || — || align=right | 1.5 km || 
|-id=136 bgcolor=#E9E9E9
| 351136 ||  || — || November 21, 2003 || Socorro || LINEAR || JUN || align=right | 1.6 km || 
|-id=137 bgcolor=#E9E9E9
| 351137 ||  || — || November 24, 2003 || Anderson Mesa || LONEOS || EUN || align=right | 4.0 km || 
|-id=138 bgcolor=#E9E9E9
| 351138 ||  || — || November 26, 2003 || Socorro || LINEAR || — || align=right | 4.2 km || 
|-id=139 bgcolor=#E9E9E9
| 351139 ||  || — || November 30, 2003 || Kitt Peak || Spacewatch || MIS || align=right | 1.9 km || 
|-id=140 bgcolor=#E9E9E9
| 351140 ||  || — || November 19, 2003 || Palomar || NEAT || — || align=right | 1.8 km || 
|-id=141 bgcolor=#E9E9E9
| 351141 ||  || — || November 21, 2003 || Catalina || CSS || JUN || align=right | 1.0 km || 
|-id=142 bgcolor=#E9E9E9
| 351142 ||  || — || December 14, 2003 || Kitt Peak || Spacewatch || — || align=right | 3.2 km || 
|-id=143 bgcolor=#E9E9E9
| 351143 ||  || — || December 1, 2003 || Kitt Peak || Spacewatch || — || align=right | 1.3 km || 
|-id=144 bgcolor=#E9E9E9
| 351144 ||  || — || December 3, 2003 || Socorro || LINEAR || — || align=right | 2.1 km || 
|-id=145 bgcolor=#E9E9E9
| 351145 ||  || — || December 17, 2003 || Needville || Needville Obs. || MIS || align=right | 2.8 km || 
|-id=146 bgcolor=#E9E9E9
| 351146 ||  || — || December 17, 2003 || Socorro || LINEAR || — || align=right | 1.9 km || 
|-id=147 bgcolor=#E9E9E9
| 351147 ||  || — || December 17, 2003 || Kitt Peak || Spacewatch || — || align=right | 4.2 km || 
|-id=148 bgcolor=#E9E9E9
| 351148 ||  || — || December 17, 2003 || Palomar || NEAT || EUN || align=right | 1.5 km || 
|-id=149 bgcolor=#E9E9E9
| 351149 ||  || — || December 18, 2003 || Socorro || LINEAR || JUN || align=right | 1.5 km || 
|-id=150 bgcolor=#E9E9E9
| 351150 ||  || — || December 19, 2003 || Kitt Peak || Spacewatch || — || align=right | 2.1 km || 
|-id=151 bgcolor=#E9E9E9
| 351151 ||  || — || December 18, 2003 || Socorro || LINEAR || — || align=right | 2.2 km || 
|-id=152 bgcolor=#E9E9E9
| 351152 ||  || — || December 18, 2003 || Socorro || LINEAR || ADE || align=right | 3.0 km || 
|-id=153 bgcolor=#E9E9E9
| 351153 ||  || — || December 19, 2003 || Socorro || LINEAR || — || align=right | 1.4 km || 
|-id=154 bgcolor=#E9E9E9
| 351154 ||  || — || December 18, 2003 || Socorro || LINEAR || — || align=right | 2.2 km || 
|-id=155 bgcolor=#E9E9E9
| 351155 ||  || — || December 22, 2003 || Socorro || LINEAR || GAL || align=right | 1.8 km || 
|-id=156 bgcolor=#E9E9E9
| 351156 ||  || — || December 28, 2003 || Socorro || LINEAR || — || align=right | 3.9 km || 
|-id=157 bgcolor=#E9E9E9
| 351157 ||  || — || December 29, 2003 || Socorro || LINEAR || IAN || align=right | 1.3 km || 
|-id=158 bgcolor=#E9E9E9
| 351158 ||  || — || December 17, 2003 || Kitt Peak || Spacewatch || — || align=right | 1.4 km || 
|-id=159 bgcolor=#E9E9E9
| 351159 ||  || — || December 17, 2003 || Kitt Peak || Spacewatch || — || align=right | 2.7 km || 
|-id=160 bgcolor=#E9E9E9
| 351160 ||  || — || December 18, 2003 || Socorro || LINEAR || — || align=right | 3.0 km || 
|-id=161 bgcolor=#E9E9E9
| 351161 ||  || — || December 19, 2003 || Kitt Peak || Spacewatch || — || align=right | 1.6 km || 
|-id=162 bgcolor=#E9E9E9
| 351162 ||  || — || December 23, 2003 || Socorro || LINEAR || — || align=right | 2.4 km || 
|-id=163 bgcolor=#E9E9E9
| 351163 ||  || — || January 15, 2004 || Kitt Peak || Spacewatch || — || align=right | 1.7 km || 
|-id=164 bgcolor=#E9E9E9
| 351164 ||  || — || January 13, 2004 || Kitt Peak || Spacewatch || AEO || align=right | 1.2 km || 
|-id=165 bgcolor=#E9E9E9
| 351165 ||  || — || January 15, 2004 || Kitt Peak || Spacewatch || — || align=right | 1.8 km || 
|-id=166 bgcolor=#E9E9E9
| 351166 ||  || — || January 16, 2004 || Palomar || NEAT || — || align=right | 3.5 km || 
|-id=167 bgcolor=#E9E9E9
| 351167 ||  || — || January 16, 2004 || Palomar || NEAT || XIZ || align=right | 1.6 km || 
|-id=168 bgcolor=#E9E9E9
| 351168 ||  || — || January 16, 2004 || Palomar || NEAT || JUN || align=right | 1.1 km || 
|-id=169 bgcolor=#E9E9E9
| 351169 ||  || — || January 16, 2004 || Palomar || NEAT || HNA || align=right | 2.4 km || 
|-id=170 bgcolor=#E9E9E9
| 351170 ||  || — || January 18, 2004 || Pla D'Arguines || Pla D'Arguines Obs. || CLO || align=right | 2.6 km || 
|-id=171 bgcolor=#E9E9E9
| 351171 ||  || — || January 17, 2004 || Palomar || NEAT || — || align=right | 1.9 km || 
|-id=172 bgcolor=#E9E9E9
| 351172 ||  || — || January 18, 2004 || Palomar || NEAT || — || align=right | 2.3 km || 
|-id=173 bgcolor=#E9E9E9
| 351173 ||  || — || January 18, 2004 || Palomar || NEAT || — || align=right | 2.4 km || 
|-id=174 bgcolor=#E9E9E9
| 351174 ||  || — || January 21, 2004 || Socorro || LINEAR || CLO || align=right | 3.1 km || 
|-id=175 bgcolor=#E9E9E9
| 351175 ||  || — || January 21, 2004 || Socorro || LINEAR || AEO || align=right | 1.3 km || 
|-id=176 bgcolor=#E9E9E9
| 351176 ||  || — || January 22, 2004 || Socorro || LINEAR || — || align=right | 1.7 km || 
|-id=177 bgcolor=#E9E9E9
| 351177 ||  || — || January 22, 2004 || Socorro || LINEAR || AER || align=right | 1.8 km || 
|-id=178 bgcolor=#E9E9E9
| 351178 ||  || — || January 24, 2004 || Socorro || LINEAR || — || align=right | 2.0 km || 
|-id=179 bgcolor=#E9E9E9
| 351179 ||  || — || January 24, 2004 || Socorro || LINEAR || — || align=right | 2.4 km || 
|-id=180 bgcolor=#E9E9E9
| 351180 ||  || — || January 24, 2004 || Socorro || LINEAR || — || align=right | 2.5 km || 
|-id=181 bgcolor=#E9E9E9
| 351181 ||  || — || January 27, 2004 || Kitt Peak || Spacewatch || DOR || align=right | 2.3 km || 
|-id=182 bgcolor=#E9E9E9
| 351182 ||  || — || January 30, 2004 || Socorro || LINEAR || — || align=right | 2.4 km || 
|-id=183 bgcolor=#E9E9E9
| 351183 ||  || — || January 28, 2004 || Catalina || CSS || DOR || align=right | 3.6 km || 
|-id=184 bgcolor=#E9E9E9
| 351184 ||  || — || January 17, 2004 || Palomar || NEAT || — || align=right | 2.6 km || 
|-id=185 bgcolor=#E9E9E9
| 351185 ||  || — || January 19, 2004 || Socorro || LINEAR || — || align=right | 3.7 km || 
|-id=186 bgcolor=#E9E9E9
| 351186 ||  || — || February 12, 2004 || Kitt Peak || Spacewatch || — || align=right | 1.9 km || 
|-id=187 bgcolor=#E9E9E9
| 351187 ||  || — || February 12, 2004 || Palomar || NEAT || — || align=right | 2.8 km || 
|-id=188 bgcolor=#E9E9E9
| 351188 ||  || — || February 12, 2004 || Kitt Peak || Spacewatch || AGN || align=right | 1.3 km || 
|-id=189 bgcolor=#E9E9E9
| 351189 ||  || — || February 14, 2004 || Haleakala || NEAT || PAE || align=right | 3.0 km || 
|-id=190 bgcolor=#E9E9E9
| 351190 ||  || — || February 15, 2004 || Socorro || LINEAR || — || align=right | 3.4 km || 
|-id=191 bgcolor=#E9E9E9
| 351191 ||  || — || February 15, 2004 || Socorro || LINEAR || — || align=right | 4.2 km || 
|-id=192 bgcolor=#FA8072
| 351192 ||  || — || February 12, 2004 || Kitt Peak || Spacewatch || — || align=right data-sort-value="0.49" | 490 m || 
|-id=193 bgcolor=#E9E9E9
| 351193 ||  || — || February 11, 2004 || Palomar || NEAT || — || align=right | 2.6 km || 
|-id=194 bgcolor=#E9E9E9
| 351194 ||  || — || February 18, 2004 || Catalina || CSS || — || align=right | 3.6 km || 
|-id=195 bgcolor=#E9E9E9
| 351195 ||  || — || February 19, 2004 || Socorro || LINEAR || — || align=right | 2.8 km || 
|-id=196 bgcolor=#E9E9E9
| 351196 ||  || — || February 16, 2004 || Kitt Peak || Spacewatch || MRX || align=right | 1.4 km || 
|-id=197 bgcolor=#E9E9E9
| 351197 ||  || — || February 19, 2004 || Socorro || LINEAR || — || align=right | 3.1 km || 
|-id=198 bgcolor=#E9E9E9
| 351198 ||  || — || February 25, 2004 || Socorro || LINEAR || — || align=right | 3.5 km || 
|-id=199 bgcolor=#E9E9E9
| 351199 ||  || — || February 12, 2004 || Kitt Peak || Spacewatch || — || align=right | 2.1 km || 
|-id=200 bgcolor=#E9E9E9
| 351200 ||  || — || March 15, 2004 || Kitt Peak || Spacewatch || — || align=right | 2.4 km || 
|}

351201–351300 

|-bgcolor=#E9E9E9
| 351201 ||  || — || March 19, 2004 || Socorro || LINEAR || — || align=right | 2.4 km || 
|-id=202 bgcolor=#E9E9E9
| 351202 ||  || — || March 23, 2004 || Socorro || LINEAR || — || align=right | 2.4 km || 
|-id=203 bgcolor=#fefefe
| 351203 ||  || — || March 22, 2004 || Anderson Mesa || LONEOS || — || align=right | 1.1 km || 
|-id=204 bgcolor=#d6d6d6
| 351204 ||  || — || March 27, 2004 || Kitt Peak || Spacewatch || — || align=right | 3.2 km || 
|-id=205 bgcolor=#d6d6d6
| 351205 ||  || — || March 27, 2004 || Kitt Peak || Spacewatch || EOS || align=right | 1.8 km || 
|-id=206 bgcolor=#d6d6d6
| 351206 ||  || — || April 12, 2004 || Siding Spring || SSS || — || align=right | 3.7 km || 
|-id=207 bgcolor=#fefefe
| 351207 ||  || — || April 21, 2004 || Socorro || LINEAR || FLO || align=right data-sort-value="0.78" | 780 m || 
|-id=208 bgcolor=#fefefe
| 351208 ||  || — || April 22, 2004 || Socorro || LINEAR || — || align=right | 1.1 km || 
|-id=209 bgcolor=#d6d6d6
| 351209 ||  || — || May 15, 2004 || Socorro || LINEAR || EUP || align=right | 4.9 km || 
|-id=210 bgcolor=#C2FFFF
| 351210 ||  || — || April 25, 2004 || Kitt Peak || Spacewatch || L4 || align=right | 15 km || 
|-id=211 bgcolor=#fefefe
| 351211 ||  || — || June 11, 2004 || Socorro || LINEAR || — || align=right | 1.5 km || 
|-id=212 bgcolor=#d6d6d6
| 351212 ||  || — || June 8, 2004 || Kitt Peak || Spacewatch || EUP || align=right | 3.8 km || 
|-id=213 bgcolor=#d6d6d6
| 351213 ||  || — || June 18, 2004 || Piszkéstető || K. Sárneczky || — || align=right | 3.9 km || 
|-id=214 bgcolor=#fefefe
| 351214 ||  || — || July 7, 2004 || Campo Imperatore || CINEOS || — || align=right | 1.0 km || 
|-id=215 bgcolor=#fefefe
| 351215 ||  || — || July 12, 2004 || Reedy Creek || J. Broughton || FLO || align=right data-sort-value="0.68" | 680 m || 
|-id=216 bgcolor=#d6d6d6
| 351216 ||  || — || July 11, 2004 || Socorro || LINEAR || — || align=right | 3.3 km || 
|-id=217 bgcolor=#fefefe
| 351217 ||  || — || July 11, 2004 || Socorro || LINEAR || PHO || align=right data-sort-value="0.95" | 950 m || 
|-id=218 bgcolor=#fefefe
| 351218 ||  || — || July 16, 2004 || Socorro || LINEAR || V || align=right data-sort-value="0.81" | 810 m || 
|-id=219 bgcolor=#fefefe
| 351219 ||  || — || July 20, 2004 || Reedy Creek || J. Broughton || PHO || align=right | 3.0 km || 
|-id=220 bgcolor=#fefefe
| 351220 ||  || — || August 7, 2004 || Reedy Creek || J. Broughton || — || align=right | 1.2 km || 
|-id=221 bgcolor=#fefefe
| 351221 ||  || — || August 6, 2004 || Palomar || NEAT || — || align=right | 1.0 km || 
|-id=222 bgcolor=#fefefe
| 351222 ||  || — || August 6, 2004 || Palomar || NEAT || — || align=right | 1.0 km || 
|-id=223 bgcolor=#FA8072
| 351223 ||  || — || July 16, 2004 || Socorro || LINEAR || — || align=right | 1.1 km || 
|-id=224 bgcolor=#d6d6d6
| 351224 ||  || — || August 7, 2004 || Palomar || NEAT || — || align=right | 5.3 km || 
|-id=225 bgcolor=#fefefe
| 351225 ||  || — || August 9, 2004 || Reedy Creek || J. Broughton || — || align=right data-sort-value="0.93" | 930 m || 
|-id=226 bgcolor=#fefefe
| 351226 ||  || — || August 8, 2004 || Socorro || LINEAR || NYS || align=right data-sort-value="0.82" | 820 m || 
|-id=227 bgcolor=#fefefe
| 351227 ||  || — || August 9, 2004 || Socorro || LINEAR || — || align=right | 1.2 km || 
|-id=228 bgcolor=#fefefe
| 351228 ||  || — || August 9, 2004 || Socorro || LINEAR || — || align=right | 1.0 km || 
|-id=229 bgcolor=#fefefe
| 351229 ||  || — || August 8, 2004 || Socorro || LINEAR || ERI || align=right | 1.8 km || 
|-id=230 bgcolor=#d6d6d6
| 351230 ||  || — || August 8, 2004 || Palomar || NEAT || — || align=right | 4.3 km || 
|-id=231 bgcolor=#fefefe
| 351231 ||  || — || August 8, 2004 || Socorro || LINEAR || NYS || align=right data-sort-value="0.80" | 800 m || 
|-id=232 bgcolor=#d6d6d6
| 351232 ||  || — || August 9, 2004 || Campo Imperatore || CINEOS || — || align=right | 3.7 km || 
|-id=233 bgcolor=#fefefe
| 351233 ||  || — || August 9, 2004 || Socorro || LINEAR || — || align=right | 1.0 km || 
|-id=234 bgcolor=#fefefe
| 351234 ||  || — || August 8, 2004 || Socorro || LINEAR || NYS || align=right data-sort-value="0.73" | 730 m || 
|-id=235 bgcolor=#fefefe
| 351235 ||  || — || August 11, 2004 || Wrightwood || J. W. Young || NYS || align=right data-sort-value="0.84" | 840 m || 
|-id=236 bgcolor=#fefefe
| 351236 ||  || — || August 10, 2004 || Campo Imperatore || CINEOS || — || align=right data-sort-value="0.91" | 910 m || 
|-id=237 bgcolor=#FA8072
| 351237 ||  || — || August 21, 2004 || Siding Spring || SSS || — || align=right | 1.3 km || 
|-id=238 bgcolor=#fefefe
| 351238 ||  || — || September 4, 2004 || Palomar || NEAT || V || align=right data-sort-value="0.81" | 810 m || 
|-id=239 bgcolor=#fefefe
| 351239 ||  || — || September 7, 2004 || Socorro || LINEAR || — || align=right data-sort-value="0.94" | 940 m || 
|-id=240 bgcolor=#fefefe
| 351240 ||  || — || September 7, 2004 || Socorro || LINEAR || — || align=right data-sort-value="0.75" | 750 m || 
|-id=241 bgcolor=#fefefe
| 351241 ||  || — || September 7, 2004 || Kitt Peak || Spacewatch || MAS || align=right data-sort-value="0.90" | 900 m || 
|-id=242 bgcolor=#fefefe
| 351242 ||  || — || September 6, 2004 || Palomar || NEAT || — || align=right data-sort-value="0.86" | 860 m || 
|-id=243 bgcolor=#fefefe
| 351243 ||  || — || September 7, 2004 || Socorro || LINEAR || PHO || align=right | 1.6 km || 
|-id=244 bgcolor=#fefefe
| 351244 ||  || — || September 8, 2004 || Socorro || LINEAR || NYS || align=right data-sort-value="0.84" | 840 m || 
|-id=245 bgcolor=#fefefe
| 351245 ||  || — || September 8, 2004 || Socorro || LINEAR || MAS || align=right data-sort-value="0.83" | 830 m || 
|-id=246 bgcolor=#fefefe
| 351246 ||  || — || September 8, 2004 || Socorro || LINEAR || FLO || align=right data-sort-value="0.66" | 660 m || 
|-id=247 bgcolor=#d6d6d6
| 351247 ||  || — || September 8, 2004 || Socorro || LINEAR || — || align=right | 4.8 km || 
|-id=248 bgcolor=#fefefe
| 351248 ||  || — || September 8, 2004 || Socorro || LINEAR || MAS || align=right data-sort-value="0.86" | 860 m || 
|-id=249 bgcolor=#fefefe
| 351249 ||  || — || September 8, 2004 || Socorro || LINEAR || NYS || align=right data-sort-value="0.91" | 910 m || 
|-id=250 bgcolor=#fefefe
| 351250 ||  || — || September 8, 2004 || Socorro || LINEAR || NYS || align=right data-sort-value="0.79" | 790 m || 
|-id=251 bgcolor=#fefefe
| 351251 ||  || — || September 8, 2004 || Socorro || LINEAR || ERI || align=right | 2.1 km || 
|-id=252 bgcolor=#fefefe
| 351252 ||  || — || September 8, 2004 || Socorro || LINEAR || — || align=right data-sort-value="0.93" | 930 m || 
|-id=253 bgcolor=#fefefe
| 351253 ||  || — || September 8, 2004 || Socorro || LINEAR || — || align=right | 1.0 km || 
|-id=254 bgcolor=#d6d6d6
| 351254 ||  || — || September 8, 2004 || Socorro || LINEAR || TIR || align=right | 4.3 km || 
|-id=255 bgcolor=#fefefe
| 351255 ||  || — || September 8, 2004 || Socorro || LINEAR || FLO || align=right data-sort-value="0.73" | 730 m || 
|-id=256 bgcolor=#fefefe
| 351256 ||  || — || September 8, 2004 || Socorro || LINEAR || V || align=right data-sort-value="0.81" | 810 m || 
|-id=257 bgcolor=#fefefe
| 351257 ||  || — || September 8, 2004 || Socorro || LINEAR || — || align=right | 1.1 km || 
|-id=258 bgcolor=#fefefe
| 351258 ||  || — || September 8, 2004 || Socorro || LINEAR || — || align=right data-sort-value="0.92" | 920 m || 
|-id=259 bgcolor=#fefefe
| 351259 ||  || — || September 7, 2004 || Socorro || LINEAR || — || align=right | 1.00 km || 
|-id=260 bgcolor=#fefefe
| 351260 ||  || — || September 8, 2004 || Socorro || LINEAR || — || align=right | 1.3 km || 
|-id=261 bgcolor=#fefefe
| 351261 ||  || — || September 8, 2004 || Socorro || LINEAR || NYS || align=right data-sort-value="0.74" | 740 m || 
|-id=262 bgcolor=#fefefe
| 351262 ||  || — || September 10, 2004 || Socorro || LINEAR || V || align=right data-sort-value="0.74" | 740 m || 
|-id=263 bgcolor=#fefefe
| 351263 ||  || — || September 10, 2004 || Socorro || LINEAR || FLO || align=right data-sort-value="0.77" | 770 m || 
|-id=264 bgcolor=#fefefe
| 351264 ||  || — || September 10, 2004 || Socorro || LINEAR || V || align=right data-sort-value="0.83" | 830 m || 
|-id=265 bgcolor=#fefefe
| 351265 ||  || — || September 10, 2004 || Socorro || LINEAR || V || align=right data-sort-value="0.82" | 820 m || 
|-id=266 bgcolor=#fefefe
| 351266 ||  || — || September 10, 2004 || Socorro || LINEAR || H || align=right data-sort-value="0.87" | 870 m || 
|-id=267 bgcolor=#fefefe
| 351267 ||  || — || September 10, 2004 || Socorro || LINEAR || — || align=right | 1.1 km || 
|-id=268 bgcolor=#d6d6d6
| 351268 ||  || — || September 10, 2004 || Socorro || LINEAR || — || align=right | 4.5 km || 
|-id=269 bgcolor=#fefefe
| 351269 ||  || — || September 12, 2004 || Socorro || LINEAR || — || align=right data-sort-value="0.98" | 980 m || 
|-id=270 bgcolor=#fefefe
| 351270 ||  || — || September 12, 2004 || Socorro || LINEAR || — || align=right | 1.1 km || 
|-id=271 bgcolor=#fefefe
| 351271 ||  || — || September 9, 2004 || Socorro || LINEAR || MAS || align=right data-sort-value="0.98" | 980 m || 
|-id=272 bgcolor=#fefefe
| 351272 ||  || — || September 9, 2004 || Kitt Peak || Spacewatch || MAS || align=right data-sort-value="0.78" | 780 m || 
|-id=273 bgcolor=#fefefe
| 351273 ||  || — || August 15, 2004 || Campo Imperatore || CINEOS || — || align=right data-sort-value="0.64" | 640 m || 
|-id=274 bgcolor=#fefefe
| 351274 ||  || — || September 11, 2004 || Kitt Peak || Spacewatch || — || align=right data-sort-value="0.98" | 980 m || 
|-id=275 bgcolor=#fefefe
| 351275 ||  || — || September 15, 2004 || 7300 Observatory || 7300 Obs. || — || align=right data-sort-value="0.95" | 950 m || 
|-id=276 bgcolor=#fefefe
| 351276 ||  || — || September 15, 2004 || Kitt Peak || Spacewatch || — || align=right data-sort-value="0.86" | 860 m || 
|-id=277 bgcolor=#fefefe
| 351277 ||  || — || September 13, 2004 || Socorro || LINEAR || — || align=right data-sort-value="0.94" | 940 m || 
|-id=278 bgcolor=#FFC2E0
| 351278 ||  || — || September 21, 2004 || Socorro || LINEAR || APO || align=right data-sort-value="0.63" | 630 m || 
|-id=279 bgcolor=#fefefe
| 351279 ||  || — || September 17, 2004 || Desert Eagle || W. K. Y. Yeung || NYS || align=right data-sort-value="0.82" | 820 m || 
|-id=280 bgcolor=#fefefe
| 351280 ||  || — || September 17, 2004 || Socorro || LINEAR || NYS || align=right data-sort-value="0.80" | 800 m || 
|-id=281 bgcolor=#fefefe
| 351281 ||  || — || September 17, 2004 || Socorro || LINEAR || NYS || align=right data-sort-value="0.82" | 820 m || 
|-id=282 bgcolor=#d6d6d6
| 351282 ||  || — || September 16, 2004 || Anderson Mesa || LONEOS || MEL || align=right | 4.7 km || 
|-id=283 bgcolor=#fefefe
| 351283 ||  || — || October 2, 2004 || Needville || Needville Obs. || NYS || align=right data-sort-value="0.71" | 710 m || 
|-id=284 bgcolor=#fefefe
| 351284 ||  || — || October 4, 2004 || Kitt Peak || Spacewatch || MAScritical || align=right data-sort-value="0.75" | 750 m || 
|-id=285 bgcolor=#E9E9E9
| 351285 ||  || — || October 7, 2004 || Goodricke-Pigott || R. A. Tucker || — || align=right | 1.1 km || 
|-id=286 bgcolor=#fefefe
| 351286 ||  || — || October 7, 2004 || Socorro || LINEAR || — || align=right | 3.0 km || 
|-id=287 bgcolor=#fefefe
| 351287 ||  || — || October 8, 2004 || Socorro || LINEAR || H || align=right data-sort-value="0.92" | 920 m || 
|-id=288 bgcolor=#fefefe
| 351288 ||  || — || October 4, 2004 || Kitt Peak || Spacewatch || NYS || align=right data-sort-value="0.76" | 760 m || 
|-id=289 bgcolor=#fefefe
| 351289 ||  || — || October 4, 2004 || Kitt Peak || Spacewatch || — || align=right | 1.0 km || 
|-id=290 bgcolor=#fefefe
| 351290 ||  || — || October 5, 2004 || Anderson Mesa || LONEOS || NYS || align=right data-sort-value="0.77" | 770 m || 
|-id=291 bgcolor=#fefefe
| 351291 ||  || — || October 5, 2004 || Kitt Peak || Spacewatch || FLO || align=right data-sort-value="0.64" | 640 m || 
|-id=292 bgcolor=#fefefe
| 351292 ||  || — || October 5, 2004 || Kitt Peak || Spacewatch || MAS || align=right data-sort-value="0.81" | 810 m || 
|-id=293 bgcolor=#fefefe
| 351293 ||  || — || October 7, 2004 || Kitt Peak || Spacewatch || — || align=right data-sort-value="0.98" | 980 m || 
|-id=294 bgcolor=#fefefe
| 351294 ||  || — || September 8, 2004 || Socorro || LINEAR || V || align=right data-sort-value="0.87" | 870 m || 
|-id=295 bgcolor=#fefefe
| 351295 ||  || — || October 3, 2004 || Palomar || NEAT || — || align=right data-sort-value="0.95" | 950 m || 
|-id=296 bgcolor=#fefefe
| 351296 ||  || — || October 7, 2004 || Socorro || LINEAR || — || align=right | 1.3 km || 
|-id=297 bgcolor=#fefefe
| 351297 ||  || — || October 7, 2004 || Anderson Mesa || LONEOS || — || align=right data-sort-value="0.83" | 830 m || 
|-id=298 bgcolor=#fefefe
| 351298 ||  || — || October 7, 2004 || Socorro || LINEAR || V || align=right data-sort-value="0.84" | 840 m || 
|-id=299 bgcolor=#fefefe
| 351299 ||  || — || October 7, 2004 || Socorro || LINEAR || — || align=right | 1.1 km || 
|-id=300 bgcolor=#fefefe
| 351300 ||  || — || October 9, 2004 || Anderson Mesa || LONEOS || — || align=right data-sort-value="0.98" | 980 m || 
|}

351301–351400 

|-bgcolor=#fefefe
| 351301 ||  || — || October 7, 2004 || Kitt Peak || Spacewatch || V || align=right data-sort-value="0.72" | 720 m || 
|-id=302 bgcolor=#fefefe
| 351302 ||  || — || October 7, 2004 || Kitt Peak || Spacewatch || NYS || align=right data-sort-value="0.69" | 690 m || 
|-id=303 bgcolor=#fefefe
| 351303 ||  || — || October 7, 2004 || Kitt Peak || Spacewatch || NYS || align=right data-sort-value="0.72" | 720 m || 
|-id=304 bgcolor=#fefefe
| 351304 ||  || — || October 7, 2004 || Kitt Peak || Spacewatch || PHO || align=right | 1.5 km || 
|-id=305 bgcolor=#fefefe
| 351305 ||  || — || October 9, 2004 || Kitt Peak || Spacewatch || EUT || align=right data-sort-value="0.88" | 880 m || 
|-id=306 bgcolor=#fefefe
| 351306 ||  || — || October 10, 2004 || Kitt Peak || Spacewatch || V || align=right data-sort-value="0.85" | 850 m || 
|-id=307 bgcolor=#fefefe
| 351307 ||  || — || October 8, 2004 || Kitt Peak || Spacewatch || — || align=right data-sort-value="0.90" | 900 m || 
|-id=308 bgcolor=#fefefe
| 351308 ||  || — || October 10, 2004 || Socorro || LINEAR || — || align=right data-sort-value="0.85" | 850 m || 
|-id=309 bgcolor=#fefefe
| 351309 ||  || — || October 10, 2004 || Kitt Peak || Spacewatch || MAS || align=right data-sort-value="0.75" | 750 m || 
|-id=310 bgcolor=#fefefe
| 351310 ||  || — || October 9, 2004 || Kitt Peak || Spacewatch || — || align=right data-sort-value="0.90" | 900 m || 
|-id=311 bgcolor=#fefefe
| 351311 ||  || — || October 13, 2004 || Kitt Peak || Spacewatch || — || align=right data-sort-value="0.91" | 910 m || 
|-id=312 bgcolor=#fefefe
| 351312 ||  || — || October 14, 2004 || Socorro || LINEAR || NYS || align=right data-sort-value="0.96" | 960 m || 
|-id=313 bgcolor=#fefefe
| 351313 ||  || — || October 4, 2004 || Kitt Peak || Spacewatch || MAS || align=right data-sort-value="0.87" | 870 m || 
|-id=314 bgcolor=#fefefe
| 351314 ||  || — || October 6, 2004 || Kitt Peak || Spacewatch || MAS || align=right data-sort-value="0.85" | 850 m || 
|-id=315 bgcolor=#fefefe
| 351315 ||  || — || October 8, 2004 || Kitt Peak || Spacewatch || — || align=right | 1.1 km || 
|-id=316 bgcolor=#fefefe
| 351316 ||  || — || September 21, 2004 || Anderson Mesa || LONEOS || — || align=right | 1.0 km || 
|-id=317 bgcolor=#fefefe
| 351317 ||  || — || October 16, 2004 || Socorro || LINEAR || PHO || align=right | 1.8 km || 
|-id=318 bgcolor=#fefefe
| 351318 ||  || — || October 21, 2004 || Socorro || LINEAR || — || align=right data-sort-value="0.96" | 960 m || 
|-id=319 bgcolor=#fefefe
| 351319 ||  || — || November 3, 2004 || Kitt Peak || Spacewatch || NYS || align=right data-sort-value="0.81" | 810 m || 
|-id=320 bgcolor=#fefefe
| 351320 ||  || — || November 4, 2004 || Catalina || CSS || — || align=right data-sort-value="0.92" | 920 m || 
|-id=321 bgcolor=#fefefe
| 351321 ||  || — || November 5, 2004 || Kitt Peak || Spacewatch || — || align=right | 1.0 km || 
|-id=322 bgcolor=#fefefe
| 351322 ||  || — || November 3, 2004 || Kitt Peak || Spacewatch || — || align=right data-sort-value="0.83" | 830 m || 
|-id=323 bgcolor=#fefefe
| 351323 ||  || — || November 3, 2004 || Kitt Peak || Spacewatch || — || align=right | 1.0 km || 
|-id=324 bgcolor=#fefefe
| 351324 ||  || — || November 4, 2004 || Kitt Peak || Spacewatch || NYS || align=right data-sort-value="0.72" | 720 m || 
|-id=325 bgcolor=#fefefe
| 351325 ||  || — || October 7, 2004 || Kitt Peak || Spacewatch || — || align=right data-sort-value="0.91" | 910 m || 
|-id=326 bgcolor=#fefefe
| 351326 ||  || — || November 5, 2004 || Anderson Mesa || LONEOS || — || align=right | 1.2 km || 
|-id=327 bgcolor=#fefefe
| 351327 ||  || — || November 12, 2004 || Catalina || CSS || H || align=right data-sort-value="0.94" | 940 m || 
|-id=328 bgcolor=#fefefe
| 351328 ||  || — || November 19, 2004 || Socorro || LINEAR || — || align=right | 3.8 km || 
|-id=329 bgcolor=#fefefe
| 351329 ||  || — || December 1, 2004 || Palomar || NEAT || — || align=right | 1.1 km || 
|-id=330 bgcolor=#fefefe
| 351330 ||  || — || December 8, 2004 || Socorro || LINEAR || — || align=right | 1.2 km || 
|-id=331 bgcolor=#FFC2E0
| 351331 ||  || — || December 10, 2004 || Catalina || CSS || APO || align=right data-sort-value="0.58" | 580 m || 
|-id=332 bgcolor=#fefefe
| 351332 ||  || — || December 10, 2004 || Junk Bond || Junk Bond Obs. || — || align=right | 1.1 km || 
|-id=333 bgcolor=#fefefe
| 351333 ||  || — || December 10, 2004 || Kitt Peak || Spacewatch || — || align=right | 1.2 km || 
|-id=334 bgcolor=#E9E9E9
| 351334 ||  || — || December 10, 2004 || Kitt Peak || Spacewatch || — || align=right | 1.4 km || 
|-id=335 bgcolor=#FA8072
| 351335 ||  || — || December 10, 2004 || Catalina || CSS || H || align=right data-sort-value="0.88" | 880 m || 
|-id=336 bgcolor=#E9E9E9
| 351336 ||  || — || December 1, 2004 || Catalina || CSS || — || align=right | 1.6 km || 
|-id=337 bgcolor=#E9E9E9
| 351337 ||  || — || December 13, 2004 || Kitt Peak || Spacewatch || — || align=right | 2.7 km || 
|-id=338 bgcolor=#E9E9E9
| 351338 ||  || — || December 15, 2004 || Kitt Peak || Spacewatch || — || align=right | 1.4 km || 
|-id=339 bgcolor=#d6d6d6
| 351339 ||  || — || December 3, 2004 || Kitt Peak || Spacewatch || SHU3:2 || align=right | 5.1 km || 
|-id=340 bgcolor=#FFC2E0
| 351340 ||  || — || December 20, 2004 || Socorro || LINEAR || APO +1km || align=right data-sort-value="0.87" | 870 m || 
|-id=341 bgcolor=#E9E9E9
| 351341 ||  || — || January 6, 2005 || Catalina || CSS || — || align=right | 1.0 km || 
|-id=342 bgcolor=#E9E9E9
| 351342 ||  || — || January 7, 2005 || Socorro || LINEAR || — || align=right | 1.4 km || 
|-id=343 bgcolor=#E9E9E9
| 351343 ||  || — || January 6, 2005 || Catalina || CSS || — || align=right | 1.3 km || 
|-id=344 bgcolor=#E9E9E9
| 351344 ||  || — || January 7, 2005 || Catalina || CSS || — || align=right | 1.1 km || 
|-id=345 bgcolor=#fefefe
| 351345 ||  || — || January 13, 2005 || Socorro || LINEAR || H || align=right data-sort-value="0.98" | 980 m || 
|-id=346 bgcolor=#E9E9E9
| 351346 ||  || — || January 9, 2005 || Catalina || CSS || — || align=right | 1.9 km || 
|-id=347 bgcolor=#fefefe
| 351347 ||  || — || January 15, 2005 || Socorro || LINEAR || — || align=right | 1.2 km || 
|-id=348 bgcolor=#fefefe
| 351348 ||  || — || January 15, 2005 || Anderson Mesa || LONEOS || H || align=right | 1.2 km || 
|-id=349 bgcolor=#E9E9E9
| 351349 ||  || — || January 13, 2005 || Kitt Peak || Spacewatch || EUN || align=right | 1.6 km || 
|-id=350 bgcolor=#E9E9E9
| 351350 ||  || — || January 13, 2005 || Kitt Peak || Spacewatch || — || align=right | 3.1 km || 
|-id=351 bgcolor=#E9E9E9
| 351351 ||  || — || January 13, 2005 || Kitt Peak || Spacewatch || AER || align=right | 1.8 km || 
|-id=352 bgcolor=#E9E9E9
| 351352 ||  || — || January 15, 2005 || Kitt Peak || Spacewatch || — || align=right | 1.6 km || 
|-id=353 bgcolor=#E9E9E9
| 351353 || 2005 BA || — || January 16, 2005 || Mayhill || A. Lowe || — || align=right | 1.2 km || 
|-id=354 bgcolor=#E9E9E9
| 351354 ||  || — || January 16, 2005 || Socorro || LINEAR || — || align=right | 2.0 km || 
|-id=355 bgcolor=#E9E9E9
| 351355 ||  || — || January 16, 2005 || Socorro || LINEAR || — || align=right | 1.6 km || 
|-id=356 bgcolor=#E9E9E9
| 351356 ||  || — || January 16, 2005 || Kitt Peak || Spacewatch || — || align=right | 1.5 km || 
|-id=357 bgcolor=#E9E9E9
| 351357 ||  || — || January 17, 2005 || Socorro || LINEAR || — || align=right | 1.9 km || 
|-id=358 bgcolor=#E9E9E9
| 351358 ||  || — || January 16, 2005 || Mauna Kea || C. Veillet || — || align=right data-sort-value="0.93" | 930 m || 
|-id=359 bgcolor=#E9E9E9
| 351359 ||  || — || January 19, 2005 || Kitt Peak || Spacewatch || — || align=right | 1.2 km || 
|-id=360 bgcolor=#E9E9E9
| 351360 ||  || — || February 1, 2005 || Catalina || CSS || EUN || align=right | 1.4 km || 
|-id=361 bgcolor=#E9E9E9
| 351361 ||  || — || February 1, 2005 || Kitt Peak || Spacewatch || — || align=right data-sort-value="0.96" | 960 m || 
|-id=362 bgcolor=#fefefe
| 351362 ||  || — || February 1, 2005 || Catalina || CSS || H || align=right | 1.0 km || 
|-id=363 bgcolor=#E9E9E9
| 351363 ||  || — || February 1, 2005 || Catalina || CSS || — || align=right | 1.2 km || 
|-id=364 bgcolor=#E9E9E9
| 351364 ||  || — || February 1, 2005 || Catalina || CSS || — || align=right | 1.6 km || 
|-id=365 bgcolor=#E9E9E9
| 351365 ||  || — || February 2, 2005 || Catalina || CSS || — || align=right | 1.1 km || 
|-id=366 bgcolor=#E9E9E9
| 351366 ||  || — || February 1, 2005 || Kitt Peak || Spacewatch || — || align=right | 1.2 km || 
|-id=367 bgcolor=#E9E9E9
| 351367 ||  || — || February 5, 2005 || Bergisch Gladbac || W. Bickel || — || align=right | 1.8 km || 
|-id=368 bgcolor=#FA8072
| 351368 ||  || — || February 9, 2005 || Kitt Peak || Spacewatch || H || align=right data-sort-value="0.91" | 910 m || 
|-id=369 bgcolor=#E9E9E9
| 351369 ||  || — || February 2, 2005 || Socorro || LINEAR || — || align=right | 1.3 km || 
|-id=370 bgcolor=#FFC2E0
| 351370 ||  || — || March 1, 2005 || Socorro || LINEAR || APO +1km || align=right | 1.3 km || 
|-id=371 bgcolor=#E9E9E9
| 351371 ||  || — || March 2, 2005 || Catalina || CSS || — || align=right data-sort-value="0.90" | 900 m || 
|-id=372 bgcolor=#E9E9E9
| 351372 ||  || — || March 2, 2005 || Catalina || CSS || — || align=right | 1.2 km || 
|-id=373 bgcolor=#E9E9E9
| 351373 ||  || — || March 3, 2005 || Catalina || CSS || — || align=right | 1.1 km || 
|-id=374 bgcolor=#E9E9E9
| 351374 ||  || — || March 3, 2005 || Catalina || CSS || — || align=right data-sort-value="0.88" | 880 m || 
|-id=375 bgcolor=#E9E9E9
| 351375 ||  || — || March 1, 2005 || Catalina || CSS || — || align=right | 1.7 km || 
|-id=376 bgcolor=#E9E9E9
| 351376 ||  || — || March 4, 2005 || Catalina || CSS || RAF || align=right | 1.2 km || 
|-id=377 bgcolor=#E9E9E9
| 351377 ||  || — || March 4, 2005 || Mount Lemmon || Mount Lemmon Survey || EUN || align=right | 1.3 km || 
|-id=378 bgcolor=#E9E9E9
| 351378 ||  || — || March 4, 2005 || Kitt Peak || Spacewatch || BRG || align=right | 1.8 km || 
|-id=379 bgcolor=#E9E9E9
| 351379 ||  || — || March 4, 2005 || Mount Lemmon || Mount Lemmon Survey || — || align=right | 2.3 km || 
|-id=380 bgcolor=#E9E9E9
| 351380 ||  || — || March 7, 2005 || Socorro || LINEAR || RAF || align=right | 1.4 km || 
|-id=381 bgcolor=#E9E9E9
| 351381 ||  || — || March 4, 2005 || Socorro || LINEAR || — || align=right | 1.3 km || 
|-id=382 bgcolor=#E9E9E9
| 351382 ||  || — || March 4, 2005 || Mount Lemmon || Mount Lemmon Survey || — || align=right data-sort-value="0.85" | 850 m || 
|-id=383 bgcolor=#fefefe
| 351383 ||  || — || March 8, 2005 || Anderson Mesa || LONEOS || H || align=right | 1.1 km || 
|-id=384 bgcolor=#E9E9E9
| 351384 ||  || — || March 3, 2005 || Catalina || CSS || — || align=right data-sort-value="0.87" | 870 m || 
|-id=385 bgcolor=#E9E9E9
| 351385 ||  || — || March 9, 2005 || Kitt Peak || Spacewatch || — || align=right | 2.2 km || 
|-id=386 bgcolor=#E9E9E9
| 351386 ||  || — || March 9, 2005 || Catalina || CSS || GER || align=right | 1.7 km || 
|-id=387 bgcolor=#E9E9E9
| 351387 ||  || — || March 9, 2005 || Mount Lemmon || Mount Lemmon Survey || EUN || align=right | 1.6 km || 
|-id=388 bgcolor=#E9E9E9
| 351388 ||  || — || March 9, 2005 || Mount Lemmon || Mount Lemmon Survey || — || align=right data-sort-value="0.83" | 830 m || 
|-id=389 bgcolor=#E9E9E9
| 351389 ||  || — || March 8, 2005 || Kitt Peak || Spacewatch || — || align=right | 1.3 km || 
|-id=390 bgcolor=#E9E9E9
| 351390 ||  || — || March 9, 2005 || Anderson Mesa || LONEOS || — || align=right | 1.8 km || 
|-id=391 bgcolor=#E9E9E9
| 351391 ||  || — || March 11, 2005 || Mount Lemmon || Mount Lemmon Survey || WIT || align=right | 1.4 km || 
|-id=392 bgcolor=#E9E9E9
| 351392 ||  || — || March 11, 2005 || Mount Lemmon || Mount Lemmon Survey || — || align=right | 2.0 km || 
|-id=393 bgcolor=#E9E9E9
| 351393 ||  || — || March 8, 2005 || Socorro || LINEAR || — || align=right | 1.9 km || 
|-id=394 bgcolor=#E9E9E9
| 351394 ||  || — || March 11, 2005 || Kitt Peak || Spacewatch || — || align=right | 1.2 km || 
|-id=395 bgcolor=#E9E9E9
| 351395 ||  || — || March 9, 2005 || Catalina || CSS || HNS || align=right | 1.4 km || 
|-id=396 bgcolor=#E9E9E9
| 351396 ||  || — || March 10, 2005 || Mount Lemmon || Mount Lemmon Survey || — || align=right data-sort-value="0.93" | 930 m || 
|-id=397 bgcolor=#E9E9E9
| 351397 ||  || — || March 10, 2005 || Mount Lemmon || Mount Lemmon Survey || — || align=right data-sort-value="0.94" | 940 m || 
|-id=398 bgcolor=#d6d6d6
| 351398 ||  || — || January 17, 2005 || Kitt Peak || Spacewatch || 3:2 || align=right | 5.7 km || 
|-id=399 bgcolor=#E9E9E9
| 351399 ||  || — || March 11, 2005 || Mount Lemmon || Mount Lemmon Survey || EUN || align=right | 1.3 km || 
|-id=400 bgcolor=#E9E9E9
| 351400 ||  || — || March 11, 2005 || Catalina || CSS || — || align=right | 1.7 km || 
|}

351401–351500 

|-bgcolor=#E9E9E9
| 351401 ||  || — || March 12, 2005 || Kitt Peak || Spacewatch || — || align=right | 1.1 km || 
|-id=402 bgcolor=#E9E9E9
| 351402 ||  || — || March 9, 2005 || Socorro || LINEAR || — || align=right | 1.4 km || 
|-id=403 bgcolor=#E9E9E9
| 351403 ||  || — || March 11, 2005 || Socorro || LINEAR || RAF || align=right | 1.2 km || 
|-id=404 bgcolor=#E9E9E9
| 351404 ||  || — || March 13, 2005 || Kitt Peak || Spacewatch || — || align=right | 1.5 km || 
|-id=405 bgcolor=#E9E9E9
| 351405 ||  || — || March 13, 2005 || Kitt Peak || Spacewatch || — || align=right data-sort-value="0.83" | 830 m || 
|-id=406 bgcolor=#E9E9E9
| 351406 ||  || — || March 16, 2005 || Socorro || LINEAR || — || align=right | 1.7 km || 
|-id=407 bgcolor=#E9E9E9
| 351407 ||  || — || March 30, 2005 || Catalina || CSS || — || align=right | 3.4 km || 
|-id=408 bgcolor=#E9E9E9
| 351408 ||  || — || March 17, 2005 || Catalina || CSS || — || align=right | 2.3 km || 
|-id=409 bgcolor=#E9E9E9
| 351409 ||  || — || March 16, 2005 || Catalina || CSS || — || align=right | 1.3 km || 
|-id=410 bgcolor=#E9E9E9
| 351410 ||  || — || March 16, 2005 || Anderson Mesa || LONEOS || EUN || align=right | 1.5 km || 
|-id=411 bgcolor=#E9E9E9
| 351411 ||  || — || April 1, 2005 || Catalina || CSS || EUN || align=right | 1.6 km || 
|-id=412 bgcolor=#E9E9E9
| 351412 ||  || — || April 1, 2005 || Kitt Peak || Spacewatch || MIS || align=right | 2.6 km || 
|-id=413 bgcolor=#E9E9E9
| 351413 ||  || — || April 1, 2005 || Kitt Peak || Spacewatch || — || align=right | 2.0 km || 
|-id=414 bgcolor=#E9E9E9
| 351414 ||  || — || April 1, 2005 || Anderson Mesa || LONEOS || — || align=right | 3.4 km || 
|-id=415 bgcolor=#E9E9E9
| 351415 ||  || — || April 4, 2005 || Kitami || K. Endate || — || align=right | 2.0 km || 
|-id=416 bgcolor=#E9E9E9
| 351416 ||  || — || April 2, 2005 || Mount Lemmon || Mount Lemmon Survey || — || align=right | 1.4 km || 
|-id=417 bgcolor=#E9E9E9
| 351417 ||  || — || April 2, 2005 || Mount Lemmon || Mount Lemmon Survey || — || align=right | 1.4 km || 
|-id=418 bgcolor=#E9E9E9
| 351418 ||  || — || April 3, 2005 || Palomar || NEAT || — || align=right data-sort-value="0.95" | 950 m || 
|-id=419 bgcolor=#E9E9E9
| 351419 ||  || — || April 2, 2005 || Catalina || CSS || MIT || align=right | 2.2 km || 
|-id=420 bgcolor=#E9E9E9
| 351420 ||  || — || April 3, 2005 || Palomar || NEAT || — || align=right | 1.7 km || 
|-id=421 bgcolor=#E9E9E9
| 351421 ||  || — || April 4, 2005 || Mount Lemmon || Mount Lemmon Survey || — || align=right | 2.4 km || 
|-id=422 bgcolor=#E9E9E9
| 351422 ||  || — || March 18, 2005 || Catalina || CSS || — || align=right | 1.6 km || 
|-id=423 bgcolor=#E9E9E9
| 351423 ||  || — || April 5, 2005 || Palomar || NEAT || — || align=right | 1.6 km || 
|-id=424 bgcolor=#E9E9E9
| 351424 ||  || — || April 5, 2005 || Mount Lemmon || Mount Lemmon Survey || — || align=right | 1.5 km || 
|-id=425 bgcolor=#E9E9E9
| 351425 ||  || — || April 2, 2005 || Catalina || CSS || — || align=right | 2.9 km || 
|-id=426 bgcolor=#E9E9E9
| 351426 ||  || — || March 10, 2005 || Mount Lemmon || Mount Lemmon Survey || — || align=right | 2.5 km || 
|-id=427 bgcolor=#E9E9E9
| 351427 ||  || — || April 7, 2005 || Kitt Peak || Spacewatch || — || align=right | 2.9 km || 
|-id=428 bgcolor=#E9E9E9
| 351428 ||  || — || April 10, 2005 || Kitt Peak || Spacewatch || — || align=right | 1.3 km || 
|-id=429 bgcolor=#E9E9E9
| 351429 ||  || — || April 5, 2005 || Catalina || CSS || — || align=right | 3.7 km || 
|-id=430 bgcolor=#E9E9E9
| 351430 ||  || — || April 11, 2005 || Anderson Mesa || LONEOS || — || align=right | 2.1 km || 
|-id=431 bgcolor=#E9E9E9
| 351431 ||  || — || April 6, 2005 || Mount Lemmon || Mount Lemmon Survey || — || align=right | 1.7 km || 
|-id=432 bgcolor=#E9E9E9
| 351432 ||  || — || April 11, 2005 || Kitt Peak || Spacewatch || — || align=right | 2.5 km || 
|-id=433 bgcolor=#E9E9E9
| 351433 ||  || — || April 12, 2005 || Kitt Peak || Spacewatch || — || align=right | 2.4 km || 
|-id=434 bgcolor=#E9E9E9
| 351434 ||  || — || April 9, 2005 || Kitt Peak || Spacewatch || — || align=right | 2.0 km || 
|-id=435 bgcolor=#E9E9E9
| 351435 ||  || — || April 14, 2005 || Kitt Peak || Spacewatch || — || align=right | 2.3 km || 
|-id=436 bgcolor=#E9E9E9
| 351436 ||  || — || April 9, 2005 || Catalina || CSS || — || align=right | 3.9 km || 
|-id=437 bgcolor=#E9E9E9
| 351437 ||  || — || April 6, 2005 || Mount Lemmon || Mount Lemmon Survey || — || align=right | 2.7 km || 
|-id=438 bgcolor=#E9E9E9
| 351438 ||  || — || April 16, 2005 || Kitt Peak || Spacewatch || — || align=right | 2.5 km || 
|-id=439 bgcolor=#E9E9E9
| 351439 ||  || — || April 16, 2005 || Kitt Peak || Spacewatch || — || align=right | 1.5 km || 
|-id=440 bgcolor=#E9E9E9
| 351440 ||  || — || April 17, 2005 || Kitt Peak || Spacewatch || — || align=right | 1.0 km || 
|-id=441 bgcolor=#E9E9E9
| 351441 ||  || — || May 4, 2005 || Mauna Kea || C. Veillet || HNA || align=right | 2.1 km || 
|-id=442 bgcolor=#d6d6d6
| 351442 ||  || — || May 3, 2005 || Socorro || LINEAR || — || align=right | 2.6 km || 
|-id=443 bgcolor=#E9E9E9
| 351443 ||  || — || May 4, 2005 || Kitt Peak || Spacewatch || — || align=right | 1.8 km || 
|-id=444 bgcolor=#E9E9E9
| 351444 ||  || — || May 4, 2005 || Kitt Peak || Spacewatch || AER || align=right | 1.4 km || 
|-id=445 bgcolor=#E9E9E9
| 351445 ||  || — || May 10, 2005 || Kitt Peak || Spacewatch || — || align=right | 2.6 km || 
|-id=446 bgcolor=#E9E9E9
| 351446 ||  || — || May 9, 2005 || Catalina || CSS || — || align=right | 1.4 km || 
|-id=447 bgcolor=#E9E9E9
| 351447 ||  || — || May 14, 2005 || Catalina || CSS || BAR || align=right | 2.2 km || 
|-id=448 bgcolor=#E9E9E9
| 351448 ||  || — || May 10, 2005 || Kitt Peak || Spacewatch || — || align=right | 2.3 km || 
|-id=449 bgcolor=#E9E9E9
| 351449 ||  || — || May 14, 2005 || Kitt Peak || Spacewatch || JUN || align=right | 1.2 km || 
|-id=450 bgcolor=#E9E9E9
| 351450 ||  || — || May 14, 2005 || Mount Lemmon || Mount Lemmon Survey || — || align=right | 2.3 km || 
|-id=451 bgcolor=#E9E9E9
| 351451 ||  || — || May 8, 2005 || Kitt Peak || Spacewatch || — || align=right | 2.2 km || 
|-id=452 bgcolor=#E9E9E9
| 351452 ||  || — || May 8, 2005 || Kitt Peak || Spacewatch || — || align=right | 2.8 km || 
|-id=453 bgcolor=#E9E9E9
| 351453 ||  || — || May 30, 2005 || Siding Spring || SSS || — || align=right | 3.2 km || 
|-id=454 bgcolor=#d6d6d6
| 351454 ||  || — || May 19, 2005 || Mount Lemmon || Mount Lemmon Survey || TIR || align=right | 3.9 km || 
|-id=455 bgcolor=#E9E9E9
| 351455 ||  || — || June 1, 2005 || Kitt Peak || Spacewatch || — || align=right | 2.9 km || 
|-id=456 bgcolor=#E9E9E9
| 351456 ||  || — || June 9, 2005 || Catalina || CSS || — || align=right | 2.4 km || 
|-id=457 bgcolor=#E9E9E9
| 351457 ||  || — || June 30, 2005 || Kitt Peak || Spacewatch || — || align=right | 2.2 km || 
|-id=458 bgcolor=#d6d6d6
| 351458 ||  || — || June 30, 2005 || Kitt Peak || Spacewatch || — || align=right | 3.2 km || 
|-id=459 bgcolor=#d6d6d6
| 351459 ||  || — || June 29, 2005 || Kitt Peak || Spacewatch || — || align=right | 3.6 km || 
|-id=460 bgcolor=#d6d6d6
| 351460 ||  || — || June 30, 2005 || Kitt Peak || Spacewatch || — || align=right | 2.8 km || 
|-id=461 bgcolor=#d6d6d6
| 351461 ||  || — || June 29, 2005 || Palomar || NEAT || — || align=right | 3.6 km || 
|-id=462 bgcolor=#E9E9E9
| 351462 ||  || — || July 3, 2005 || Mount Lemmon || Mount Lemmon Survey || AGN || align=right | 1.6 km || 
|-id=463 bgcolor=#d6d6d6
| 351463 ||  || — || July 4, 2005 || Kitt Peak || Spacewatch || — || align=right | 3.4 km || 
|-id=464 bgcolor=#d6d6d6
| 351464 ||  || — || July 5, 2005 || Kitt Peak || Spacewatch || — || align=right | 3.1 km || 
|-id=465 bgcolor=#d6d6d6
| 351465 ||  || — || July 3, 2005 || Mount Lemmon || Mount Lemmon Survey || — || align=right | 2.6 km || 
|-id=466 bgcolor=#d6d6d6
| 351466 ||  || — || July 1, 2005 || Kitt Peak || Spacewatch || — || align=right | 3.3 km || 
|-id=467 bgcolor=#d6d6d6
| 351467 ||  || — || July 6, 2005 || Kitt Peak || Spacewatch || VER || align=right | 3.5 km || 
|-id=468 bgcolor=#d6d6d6
| 351468 ||  || — || July 4, 2005 || Palomar || NEAT || — || align=right | 4.4 km || 
|-id=469 bgcolor=#d6d6d6
| 351469 ||  || — || July 19, 2005 || Palomar || NEAT || — || align=right | 3.9 km || 
|-id=470 bgcolor=#d6d6d6
| 351470 ||  || — || July 29, 2005 || Palomar || NEAT || — || align=right | 3.5 km || 
|-id=471 bgcolor=#d6d6d6
| 351471 ||  || — || August 4, 2005 || Palomar || NEAT || EOS || align=right | 2.3 km || 
|-id=472 bgcolor=#d6d6d6
| 351472 ||  || — || August 4, 2005 || Palomar || NEAT || — || align=right | 4.0 km || 
|-id=473 bgcolor=#d6d6d6
| 351473 ||  || — || August 6, 2005 || Palomar || NEAT || HYG || align=right | 3.4 km || 
|-id=474 bgcolor=#d6d6d6
| 351474 ||  || — || August 6, 2005 || Palomar || NEAT || THM || align=right | 2.3 km || 
|-id=475 bgcolor=#d6d6d6
| 351475 ||  || — || August 10, 2005 || Mauna Kea || P. A. Wiegert || — || align=right | 3.6 km || 
|-id=476 bgcolor=#fefefe
| 351476 ||  || — || August 24, 2005 || Palomar || NEAT || — || align=right data-sort-value="0.72" | 720 m || 
|-id=477 bgcolor=#d6d6d6
| 351477 ||  || — || August 24, 2005 || Palomar || NEAT || — || align=right | 4.0 km || 
|-id=478 bgcolor=#d6d6d6
| 351478 ||  || — || August 25, 2005 || Palomar || NEAT || — || align=right | 2.9 km || 
|-id=479 bgcolor=#fefefe
| 351479 ||  || — || August 25, 2005 || Palomar || NEAT || — || align=right data-sort-value="0.94" | 940 m || 
|-id=480 bgcolor=#d6d6d6
| 351480 ||  || — || August 26, 2005 || Palomar || NEAT || TIR || align=right | 3.7 km || 
|-id=481 bgcolor=#d6d6d6
| 351481 ||  || — || August 25, 2005 || Palomar || NEAT || — || align=right | 3.4 km || 
|-id=482 bgcolor=#fefefe
| 351482 ||  || — || August 26, 2005 || Anderson Mesa || LONEOS || — || align=right data-sort-value="0.75" | 750 m || 
|-id=483 bgcolor=#d6d6d6
| 351483 ||  || — || August 27, 2005 || Palomar || NEAT || URS || align=right | 3.8 km || 
|-id=484 bgcolor=#d6d6d6
| 351484 ||  || — || August 27, 2005 || Palomar || NEAT || EOS || align=right | 2.0 km || 
|-id=485 bgcolor=#d6d6d6
| 351485 ||  || — || August 27, 2005 || Palomar || NEAT || — || align=right | 2.8 km || 
|-id=486 bgcolor=#d6d6d6
| 351486 ||  || — || August 27, 2005 || Palomar || NEAT || — || align=right | 2.8 km || 
|-id=487 bgcolor=#d6d6d6
| 351487 ||  || — || August 27, 2005 || Palomar || NEAT || EOS || align=right | 1.8 km || 
|-id=488 bgcolor=#d6d6d6
| 351488 ||  || — || August 27, 2005 || Palomar || NEAT || HYG || align=right | 2.9 km || 
|-id=489 bgcolor=#d6d6d6
| 351489 ||  || — || August 27, 2005 || Palomar || NEAT || EOS || align=right | 2.3 km || 
|-id=490 bgcolor=#d6d6d6
| 351490 ||  || — || August 27, 2005 || Palomar || NEAT || — || align=right | 2.7 km || 
|-id=491 bgcolor=#d6d6d6
| 351491 ||  || — || August 28, 2005 || Kitt Peak || Spacewatch || — || align=right | 2.8 km || 
|-id=492 bgcolor=#d6d6d6
| 351492 ||  || — || August 28, 2005 || Kitt Peak || Spacewatch || — || align=right | 4.2 km || 
|-id=493 bgcolor=#d6d6d6
| 351493 ||  || — || August 28, 2005 || Kitt Peak || Spacewatch || HYG || align=right | 2.2 km || 
|-id=494 bgcolor=#d6d6d6
| 351494 ||  || — || August 28, 2005 || Siding Spring || SSS || — || align=right | 3.3 km || 
|-id=495 bgcolor=#d6d6d6
| 351495 ||  || — || August 27, 2005 || Kitt Peak || Spacewatch || — || align=right | 3.9 km || 
|-id=496 bgcolor=#d6d6d6
| 351496 ||  || — || August 27, 2005 || Palomar || NEAT || EOS || align=right | 2.5 km || 
|-id=497 bgcolor=#fefefe
| 351497 ||  || — || August 30, 2005 || Kitt Peak || Spacewatch || — || align=right data-sort-value="0.83" | 830 m || 
|-id=498 bgcolor=#fefefe
| 351498 ||  || — || August 31, 2005 || Palomar || NEAT || FLO || align=right data-sort-value="0.78" | 780 m || 
|-id=499 bgcolor=#d6d6d6
| 351499 ||  || — || August 27, 2005 || Palomar || NEAT || — || align=right | 5.1 km || 
|-id=500 bgcolor=#fefefe
| 351500 ||  || — || August 28, 2005 || Kitt Peak || Spacewatch || — || align=right data-sort-value="0.63" | 630 m || 
|}

351501–351600 

|-bgcolor=#d6d6d6
| 351501 ||  || — || August 27, 2005 || Palomar || NEAT || — || align=right | 3.3 km || 
|-id=502 bgcolor=#fefefe
| 351502 ||  || — || September 3, 2005 || Palomar || NEAT || — || align=right data-sort-value="0.96" | 960 m || 
|-id=503 bgcolor=#E9E9E9
| 351503 ||  || — || September 8, 2005 || Socorro || LINEAR || — || align=right | 3.7 km || 
|-id=504 bgcolor=#fefefe
| 351504 ||  || — || September 1, 2005 || Kitt Peak || Spacewatch || — || align=right data-sort-value="0.69" | 690 m || 
|-id=505 bgcolor=#d6d6d6
| 351505 ||  || — || September 1, 2005 || Kitt Peak || Spacewatch || VER || align=right | 2.9 km || 
|-id=506 bgcolor=#fefefe
| 351506 ||  || — || September 8, 2005 || Socorro || LINEAR || FLO || align=right data-sort-value="0.67" | 670 m || 
|-id=507 bgcolor=#d6d6d6
| 351507 ||  || — || September 12, 2005 || Junk Bond || D. Healy || — || align=right | 3.7 km || 
|-id=508 bgcolor=#FFC2E0
| 351508 ||  || — || September 13, 2005 || Catalina || CSS || AMO || align=right data-sort-value="0.39" | 390 m || 
|-id=509 bgcolor=#fefefe
| 351509 ||  || — || September 12, 2005 || Junk Bond || D. Healy || — || align=right data-sort-value="0.72" | 720 m || 
|-id=510 bgcolor=#d6d6d6
| 351510 ||  || — || August 31, 2005 || Kitt Peak || Spacewatch || — || align=right | 3.2 km || 
|-id=511 bgcolor=#d6d6d6
| 351511 ||  || — || September 1, 2005 || Palomar || NEAT || — || align=right | 3.1 km || 
|-id=512 bgcolor=#d6d6d6
| 351512 ||  || — || September 14, 2005 || Apache Point || A. C. Becker || — || align=right | 3.2 km || 
|-id=513 bgcolor=#fefefe
| 351513 ||  || — || September 24, 2005 || Kitt Peak || Spacewatch || — || align=right | 1.1 km || 
|-id=514 bgcolor=#d6d6d6
| 351514 ||  || — || September 24, 2005 || Kitt Peak || Spacewatch || — || align=right | 4.6 km || 
|-id=515 bgcolor=#d6d6d6
| 351515 ||  || — || September 25, 2005 || Kitt Peak || Spacewatch || — || align=right | 3.2 km || 
|-id=516 bgcolor=#d6d6d6
| 351516 ||  || — || September 27, 2005 || Kitt Peak || Spacewatch || EOS || align=right | 2.1 km || 
|-id=517 bgcolor=#d6d6d6
| 351517 ||  || — || September 24, 2005 || Kitt Peak || Spacewatch || — || align=right | 3.5 km || 
|-id=518 bgcolor=#d6d6d6
| 351518 ||  || — || September 24, 2005 || Kitt Peak || Spacewatch || — || align=right | 2.7 km || 
|-id=519 bgcolor=#fefefe
| 351519 ||  || — || September 25, 2005 || Palomar || NEAT || NYS || align=right data-sort-value="0.72" | 720 m || 
|-id=520 bgcolor=#fefefe
| 351520 ||  || — || September 26, 2005 || Kitt Peak || Spacewatch || — || align=right data-sort-value="0.67" | 670 m || 
|-id=521 bgcolor=#d6d6d6
| 351521 ||  || — || September 28, 2005 || Palomar || NEAT || — || align=right | 3.4 km || 
|-id=522 bgcolor=#fefefe
| 351522 ||  || — || September 28, 2005 || Palomar || NEAT || — || align=right | 2.6 km || 
|-id=523 bgcolor=#d6d6d6
| 351523 ||  || — || September 28, 2005 || Palomar || NEAT || — || align=right | 4.1 km || 
|-id=524 bgcolor=#d6d6d6
| 351524 ||  || — || September 29, 2005 || Mount Lemmon || Mount Lemmon Survey || — || align=right | 2.4 km || 
|-id=525 bgcolor=#fefefe
| 351525 ||  || — || September 29, 2005 || Anderson Mesa || LONEOS || — || align=right data-sort-value="0.77" | 770 m || 
|-id=526 bgcolor=#fefefe
| 351526 ||  || — || September 29, 2005 || Mount Lemmon || Mount Lemmon Survey || — || align=right data-sort-value="0.62" | 620 m || 
|-id=527 bgcolor=#fefefe
| 351527 ||  || — || September 24, 2005 || Kitt Peak || Spacewatch || — || align=right data-sort-value="0.62" | 620 m || 
|-id=528 bgcolor=#d6d6d6
| 351528 ||  || — || September 25, 2005 || Kitt Peak || Spacewatch || — || align=right | 2.9 km || 
|-id=529 bgcolor=#d6d6d6
| 351529 ||  || — || September 25, 2005 || Kitt Peak || Spacewatch || — || align=right | 5.4 km || 
|-id=530 bgcolor=#fefefe
| 351530 ||  || — || September 28, 2005 || Palomar || NEAT || — || align=right data-sort-value="0.79" | 790 m || 
|-id=531 bgcolor=#fefefe
| 351531 ||  || — || September 29, 2005 || Kitt Peak || Spacewatch || FLO || align=right data-sort-value="0.69" | 690 m || 
|-id=532 bgcolor=#d6d6d6
| 351532 ||  || — || September 29, 2005 || Mount Lemmon || Mount Lemmon Survey || THM || align=right | 2.3 km || 
|-id=533 bgcolor=#fefefe
| 351533 ||  || — || September 29, 2005 || Kitt Peak || Spacewatch || — || align=right data-sort-value="0.89" | 890 m || 
|-id=534 bgcolor=#d6d6d6
| 351534 ||  || — || August 31, 2005 || Kitt Peak || Spacewatch || — || align=right | 3.4 km || 
|-id=535 bgcolor=#d6d6d6
| 351535 ||  || — || September 30, 2005 || Kitt Peak || Spacewatch || EOS || align=right | 2.5 km || 
|-id=536 bgcolor=#d6d6d6
| 351536 ||  || — || September 30, 2005 || Palomar || NEAT || EUP || align=right | 3.9 km || 
|-id=537 bgcolor=#d6d6d6
| 351537 ||  || — || September 30, 2005 || Mount Lemmon || Mount Lemmon Survey || — || align=right | 3.1 km || 
|-id=538 bgcolor=#d6d6d6
| 351538 ||  || — || September 29, 2005 || Catalina || CSS || — || align=right | 5.1 km || 
|-id=539 bgcolor=#fefefe
| 351539 ||  || — || September 23, 2005 || Catalina || CSS || — || align=right data-sort-value="0.78" | 780 m || 
|-id=540 bgcolor=#fefefe
| 351540 ||  || — || September 24, 2005 || Kitt Peak || Spacewatch || — || align=right data-sort-value="0.72" | 720 m || 
|-id=541 bgcolor=#fefefe
| 351541 ||  || — || September 23, 2005 || Kitt Peak || Spacewatch || — || align=right data-sort-value="0.69" | 690 m || 
|-id=542 bgcolor=#fefefe
| 351542 ||  || — || October 1, 2005 || Catalina || CSS || — || align=right | 1.1 km || 
|-id=543 bgcolor=#fefefe
| 351543 ||  || — || October 2, 2005 || Palomar || NEAT || — || align=right | 1.1 km || 
|-id=544 bgcolor=#d6d6d6
| 351544 ||  || — || October 2, 2005 || Mount Lemmon || Mount Lemmon Survey || — || align=right | 3.0 km || 
|-id=545 bgcolor=#FFC2E0
| 351545 ||  || — || October 4, 2005 || Palomar || NEAT || APO || align=right data-sort-value="0.38" | 380 m || 
|-id=546 bgcolor=#fefefe
| 351546 ||  || — || October 2, 2005 || Anderson Mesa || LONEOS || — || align=right data-sort-value="0.94" | 940 m || 
|-id=547 bgcolor=#d6d6d6
| 351547 ||  || — || October 1, 2005 || Kitt Peak || Spacewatch || — || align=right | 2.8 km || 
|-id=548 bgcolor=#fefefe
| 351548 ||  || — || October 5, 2005 || Catalina || CSS || — || align=right | 1.0 km || 
|-id=549 bgcolor=#FA8072
| 351549 ||  || — || October 6, 2005 || Catalina || CSS || — || align=right data-sort-value="0.75" | 750 m || 
|-id=550 bgcolor=#fefefe
| 351550 ||  || — || October 7, 2005 || Anderson Mesa || LONEOS || — || align=right data-sort-value="0.82" | 820 m || 
|-id=551 bgcolor=#d6d6d6
| 351551 ||  || — || October 6, 2005 || Mount Lemmon || Mount Lemmon Survey || TIR || align=right | 4.6 km || 
|-id=552 bgcolor=#fefefe
| 351552 ||  || — || September 26, 2005 || Kitt Peak || Spacewatch || — || align=right data-sort-value="0.80" | 800 m || 
|-id=553 bgcolor=#fefefe
| 351553 ||  || — || October 7, 2005 || Kitt Peak || Spacewatch || — || align=right data-sort-value="0.58" | 580 m || 
|-id=554 bgcolor=#E9E9E9
| 351554 ||  || — || March 7, 2003 || Kitt Peak || Spacewatch || MRX || align=right | 1.1 km || 
|-id=555 bgcolor=#d6d6d6
| 351555 ||  || — || October 10, 2005 || Catalina || CSS || URS || align=right | 4.3 km || 
|-id=556 bgcolor=#d6d6d6
| 351556 ||  || — || October 8, 2005 || Kitt Peak || Spacewatch || VER || align=right | 3.1 km || 
|-id=557 bgcolor=#d6d6d6
| 351557 ||  || — || October 8, 2005 || Kitt Peak || Spacewatch || — || align=right | 4.2 km || 
|-id=558 bgcolor=#E9E9E9
| 351558 ||  || — || October 4, 2005 || Palomar || NEAT || GEF || align=right | 1.5 km || 
|-id=559 bgcolor=#fefefe
| 351559 ||  || — || October 11, 2005 || Apache Point || A. C. Becker || — || align=right data-sort-value="0.72" | 720 m || 
|-id=560 bgcolor=#d6d6d6
| 351560 ||  || — || October 1, 2005 || Kitt Peak || Spacewatch || — || align=right | 4.5 km || 
|-id=561 bgcolor=#fefefe
| 351561 ||  || — || October 23, 2005 || Kitt Peak || Spacewatch || — || align=right data-sort-value="0.80" | 800 m || 
|-id=562 bgcolor=#fefefe
| 351562 ||  || — || October 23, 2005 || Catalina || CSS || FLO || align=right data-sort-value="0.71" | 710 m || 
|-id=563 bgcolor=#fefefe
| 351563 ||  || — || October 25, 2005 || Mount Lemmon || Mount Lemmon Survey || FLO || align=right data-sort-value="0.57" | 570 m || 
|-id=564 bgcolor=#fefefe
| 351564 ||  || — || October 25, 2005 || Mount Lemmon || Mount Lemmon Survey || — || align=right | 1.2 km || 
|-id=565 bgcolor=#fefefe
| 351565 ||  || — || October 27, 2005 || Mount Lemmon || Mount Lemmon Survey || — || align=right data-sort-value="0.73" | 730 m || 
|-id=566 bgcolor=#fefefe
| 351566 ||  || — || October 24, 2005 || Kitt Peak || Spacewatch || — || align=right data-sort-value="0.73" | 730 m || 
|-id=567 bgcolor=#fefefe
| 351567 ||  || — || October 24, 2005 || Kitt Peak || Spacewatch || — || align=right data-sort-value="0.94" | 940 m || 
|-id=568 bgcolor=#fefefe
| 351568 ||  || — || October 24, 2005 || Kitt Peak || Spacewatch || FLO || align=right data-sort-value="0.66" | 660 m || 
|-id=569 bgcolor=#d6d6d6
| 351569 ||  || — || October 25, 2005 || Kitt Peak || Spacewatch || VER || align=right | 3.6 km || 
|-id=570 bgcolor=#fefefe
| 351570 ||  || — || October 25, 2005 || Kitt Peak || Spacewatch || FLO || align=right data-sort-value="0.61" | 610 m || 
|-id=571 bgcolor=#fefefe
| 351571 ||  || — || October 25, 2005 || Kitt Peak || Spacewatch || — || align=right data-sort-value="0.81" | 810 m || 
|-id=572 bgcolor=#fefefe
| 351572 ||  || — || October 27, 2005 || Kitt Peak || Spacewatch || FLO || align=right data-sort-value="0.57" | 570 m || 
|-id=573 bgcolor=#fefefe
| 351573 ||  || — || October 23, 2005 || Catalina || CSS || FLO || align=right data-sort-value="0.88" | 880 m || 
|-id=574 bgcolor=#fefefe
| 351574 ||  || — || October 28, 2005 || Kitt Peak || Spacewatch || — || align=right data-sort-value="0.58" | 580 m || 
|-id=575 bgcolor=#d6d6d6
| 351575 ||  || — || October 24, 2005 || Kitt Peak || Spacewatch || — || align=right | 3.9 km || 
|-id=576 bgcolor=#fefefe
| 351576 ||  || — || October 26, 2005 || Kitt Peak || Spacewatch || — || align=right | 1.5 km || 
|-id=577 bgcolor=#d6d6d6
| 351577 ||  || — || October 26, 2005 || Kitt Peak || Spacewatch || — || align=right | 3.2 km || 
|-id=578 bgcolor=#d6d6d6
| 351578 ||  || — || October 27, 2005 || Mount Lemmon || Mount Lemmon Survey || — || align=right | 4.0 km || 
|-id=579 bgcolor=#fefefe
| 351579 ||  || — || October 29, 2005 || Mount Lemmon || Mount Lemmon Survey || — || align=right data-sort-value="0.82" | 820 m || 
|-id=580 bgcolor=#fefefe
| 351580 ||  || — || October 29, 2005 || Catalina || CSS || — || align=right | 1.0 km || 
|-id=581 bgcolor=#fefefe
| 351581 ||  || — || October 24, 2005 || Kitt Peak || Spacewatch || — || align=right data-sort-value="0.67" | 670 m || 
|-id=582 bgcolor=#fefefe
| 351582 ||  || — || October 27, 2005 || Kitt Peak || Spacewatch || — || align=right data-sort-value="0.84" | 840 m || 
|-id=583 bgcolor=#fefefe
| 351583 ||  || — || October 28, 2005 || Kitt Peak || Spacewatch || — || align=right data-sort-value="0.71" | 710 m || 
|-id=584 bgcolor=#fefefe
| 351584 ||  || — || October 28, 2005 || Socorro || LINEAR || FLO || align=right data-sort-value="0.68" | 680 m || 
|-id=585 bgcolor=#d6d6d6
| 351585 ||  || — || October 29, 2005 || Catalina || CSS || — || align=right | 4.0 km || 
|-id=586 bgcolor=#fefefe
| 351586 ||  || — || October 30, 2005 || Palomar || NEAT || FLO || align=right data-sort-value="0.75" | 750 m || 
|-id=587 bgcolor=#fefefe
| 351587 ||  || — || October 31, 2005 || Catalina || CSS || — || align=right data-sort-value="0.80" | 800 m || 
|-id=588 bgcolor=#d6d6d6
| 351588 ||  || — || October 25, 2005 || Socorro || LINEAR || EUP || align=right | 5.9 km || 
|-id=589 bgcolor=#d6d6d6
| 351589 ||  || — || October 22, 2005 || Palomar || NEAT || — || align=right | 4.3 km || 
|-id=590 bgcolor=#d6d6d6
| 351590 ||  || — || October 23, 2005 || Catalina || CSS || — || align=right | 4.5 km || 
|-id=591 bgcolor=#fefefe
| 351591 ||  || — || October 26, 2005 || Palomar || NEAT || — || align=right data-sort-value="0.78" | 780 m || 
|-id=592 bgcolor=#fefefe
| 351592 ||  || — || October 23, 2005 || Catalina || CSS || — || align=right data-sort-value="0.94" | 940 m || 
|-id=593 bgcolor=#fefefe
| 351593 ||  || — || October 28, 2005 || Kitt Peak || Spacewatch || FLO || align=right data-sort-value="0.68" | 680 m || 
|-id=594 bgcolor=#fefefe
| 351594 ||  || — || October 22, 2005 || Kitt Peak || Spacewatch || — || align=right data-sort-value="0.67" | 670 m || 
|-id=595 bgcolor=#d6d6d6
| 351595 ||  || — || October 20, 2005 || Apache Point || A. C. Becker || — || align=right | 4.2 km || 
|-id=596 bgcolor=#d6d6d6
| 351596 ||  || — || October 26, 2005 || Kitt Peak || Spacewatch || 7:4 || align=right | 2.6 km || 
|-id=597 bgcolor=#d6d6d6
| 351597 ||  || — || October 31, 2005 || Catalina || CSS || URS || align=right | 3.4 km || 
|-id=598 bgcolor=#d6d6d6
| 351598 ||  || — || October 25, 2005 || Catalina || CSS || URS || align=right | 5.5 km || 
|-id=599 bgcolor=#fefefe
| 351599 ||  || — || November 3, 2005 || Socorro || LINEAR || — || align=right data-sort-value="0.76" | 760 m || 
|-id=600 bgcolor=#fefefe
| 351600 ||  || — || November 4, 2005 || Kitt Peak || Spacewatch || — || align=right data-sort-value="0.98" | 980 m || 
|}

351601–351700 

|-bgcolor=#fefefe
| 351601 ||  || — || November 3, 2005 || Mount Lemmon || Mount Lemmon Survey || FLO || align=right data-sort-value="0.61" | 610 m || 
|-id=602 bgcolor=#d6d6d6
| 351602 ||  || — || November 6, 2005 || Kitt Peak || Spacewatch || — || align=right | 3.0 km || 
|-id=603 bgcolor=#fefefe
| 351603 ||  || — || November 1, 2005 || Anderson Mesa || LONEOS || FLO || align=right data-sort-value="0.74" | 740 m || 
|-id=604 bgcolor=#fefefe
| 351604 ||  || — || November 8, 2005 || Socorro || LINEAR || V || align=right data-sort-value="0.84" | 840 m || 
|-id=605 bgcolor=#fefefe
| 351605 ||  || — || November 10, 2005 || Kitt Peak || Spacewatch || — || align=right | 1.2 km || 
|-id=606 bgcolor=#fefefe
| 351606 ||  || — || November 10, 2005 || Mount Lemmon || Mount Lemmon Survey || V || align=right data-sort-value="0.80" | 800 m || 
|-id=607 bgcolor=#fefefe
| 351607 ||  || — || November 4, 2005 || Mount Lemmon || Mount Lemmon Survey || FLO || align=right data-sort-value="0.62" | 620 m || 
|-id=608 bgcolor=#fefefe
| 351608 ||  || — || November 7, 2005 || Mauna Kea || Mauna Kea Obs. || NYS || align=right | 1.4 km || 
|-id=609 bgcolor=#fefefe
| 351609 ||  || — || September 30, 2005 || Kitt Peak || Spacewatch || — || align=right data-sort-value="0.65" | 650 m || 
|-id=610 bgcolor=#fefefe
| 351610 ||  || — || November 1, 2005 || Apache Point || A. C. Becker || — || align=right data-sort-value="0.72" | 720 m || 
|-id=611 bgcolor=#d6d6d6
| 351611 ||  || — || November 1, 2005 || Apache Point || A. C. Becker || — || align=right | 3.5 km || 
|-id=612 bgcolor=#d6d6d6
| 351612 ||  || — || November 1, 2005 || Apache Point || A. C. Becker || EUP || align=right | 5.2 km || 
|-id=613 bgcolor=#fefefe
| 351613 ||  || — || November 22, 2005 || Kitt Peak || Spacewatch || — || align=right data-sort-value="0.63" | 630 m || 
|-id=614 bgcolor=#fefefe
| 351614 ||  || — || November 25, 2005 || Kitt Peak || Spacewatch || — || align=right data-sort-value="0.85" | 850 m || 
|-id=615 bgcolor=#FA8072
| 351615 ||  || — || November 26, 2005 || Mount Lemmon || Mount Lemmon Survey || — || align=right | 1.1 km || 
|-id=616 bgcolor=#fefefe
| 351616 ||  || — || November 28, 2005 || Socorro || LINEAR || — || align=right data-sort-value="0.94" | 940 m || 
|-id=617 bgcolor=#fefefe
| 351617 ||  || — || November 28, 2005 || Socorro || LINEAR || V || align=right data-sort-value="0.85" | 850 m || 
|-id=618 bgcolor=#fefefe
| 351618 ||  || — || November 28, 2005 || Catalina || CSS || V || align=right data-sort-value="0.86" | 860 m || 
|-id=619 bgcolor=#fefefe
| 351619 ||  || — || November 26, 2005 || Mount Lemmon || Mount Lemmon Survey || — || align=right data-sort-value="0.85" | 850 m || 
|-id=620 bgcolor=#fefefe
| 351620 ||  || — || November 30, 2005 || Mount Lemmon || Mount Lemmon Survey || — || align=right data-sort-value="0.86" | 860 m || 
|-id=621 bgcolor=#FA8072
| 351621 ||  || — || November 30, 2005 || Socorro || LINEAR || — || align=right | 1.1 km || 
|-id=622 bgcolor=#fefefe
| 351622 ||  || — || November 21, 2005 || Anderson Mesa || LONEOS || — || align=right data-sort-value="0.95" | 950 m || 
|-id=623 bgcolor=#fefefe
| 351623 ||  || — || November 28, 2005 || Catalina || CSS || FLO || align=right data-sort-value="0.70" | 700 m || 
|-id=624 bgcolor=#fefefe
| 351624 ||  || — || November 25, 2005 || Catalina || CSS || — || align=right | 1.9 km || 
|-id=625 bgcolor=#fefefe
| 351625 ||  || — || November 26, 2005 || Mount Lemmon || Mount Lemmon Survey || — || align=right data-sort-value="0.96" | 960 m || 
|-id=626 bgcolor=#fefefe
| 351626 ||  || — || November 30, 2005 || Mount Lemmon || Mount Lemmon Survey || — || align=right data-sort-value="0.93" | 930 m || 
|-id=627 bgcolor=#fefefe
| 351627 ||  || — || December 1, 2005 || Kitt Peak || Spacewatch || FLO || align=right data-sort-value="0.88" | 880 m || 
|-id=628 bgcolor=#fefefe
| 351628 ||  || — || December 4, 2005 || Mount Lemmon || Mount Lemmon Survey || — || align=right | 1.0 km || 
|-id=629 bgcolor=#fefefe
| 351629 ||  || — || December 4, 2005 || Kitt Peak || Spacewatch || FLO || align=right data-sort-value="0.89" | 890 m || 
|-id=630 bgcolor=#FA8072
| 351630 ||  || — || December 7, 2005 || Socorro || LINEAR || — || align=right | 1.00 km || 
|-id=631 bgcolor=#fefefe
| 351631 ||  || — || December 6, 2005 || Kitt Peak || Spacewatch || FLO || align=right data-sort-value="0.78" | 780 m || 
|-id=632 bgcolor=#fefefe
| 351632 ||  || — || December 8, 2005 || Kitt Peak || Spacewatch || — || align=right data-sort-value="0.90" | 900 m || 
|-id=633 bgcolor=#fefefe
| 351633 ||  || — || December 21, 2005 || Kitt Peak || Spacewatch || — || align=right data-sort-value="0.87" | 870 m || 
|-id=634 bgcolor=#fefefe
| 351634 ||  || — || December 22, 2005 || Kitt Peak || Spacewatch || NYS || align=right data-sort-value="0.69" | 690 m || 
|-id=635 bgcolor=#fefefe
| 351635 ||  || — || December 24, 2005 || Kitt Peak || Spacewatch || FLO || align=right data-sort-value="0.67" | 670 m || 
|-id=636 bgcolor=#fefefe
| 351636 ||  || — || December 24, 2005 || Kitt Peak || Spacewatch || V || align=right data-sort-value="0.58" | 580 m || 
|-id=637 bgcolor=#fefefe
| 351637 ||  || — || December 24, 2005 || Kitt Peak || Spacewatch || — || align=right data-sort-value="0.86" | 860 m || 
|-id=638 bgcolor=#fefefe
| 351638 ||  || — || December 25, 2005 || Kitt Peak || Spacewatch || — || align=right data-sort-value="0.79" | 790 m || 
|-id=639 bgcolor=#fefefe
| 351639 ||  || — || December 22, 2005 || Kitt Peak || Spacewatch || — || align=right data-sort-value="0.72" | 720 m || 
|-id=640 bgcolor=#fefefe
| 351640 ||  || — || December 24, 2005 || Kitt Peak || Spacewatch || — || align=right data-sort-value="0.69" | 690 m || 
|-id=641 bgcolor=#fefefe
| 351641 ||  || — || April 1, 2003 || Apache Point || SDSS || — || align=right data-sort-value="0.99" | 990 m || 
|-id=642 bgcolor=#fefefe
| 351642 ||  || — || December 26, 2005 || Kitt Peak || Spacewatch || — || align=right | 1.0 km || 
|-id=643 bgcolor=#fefefe
| 351643 ||  || — || December 24, 2005 || Kitt Peak || Spacewatch || V || align=right data-sort-value="0.80" | 800 m || 
|-id=644 bgcolor=#fefefe
| 351644 ||  || — || December 24, 2005 || Kitt Peak || Spacewatch || — || align=right data-sort-value="0.93" | 930 m || 
|-id=645 bgcolor=#fefefe
| 351645 ||  || — || December 24, 2005 || Kitt Peak || Spacewatch || NYS || align=right data-sort-value="0.58" | 580 m || 
|-id=646 bgcolor=#fefefe
| 351646 ||  || — || December 26, 2005 || Mount Lemmon || Mount Lemmon Survey || — || align=right data-sort-value="0.71" | 710 m || 
|-id=647 bgcolor=#fefefe
| 351647 ||  || — || December 25, 2005 || Kitt Peak || Spacewatch || — || align=right data-sort-value="0.67" | 670 m || 
|-id=648 bgcolor=#fefefe
| 351648 ||  || — || December 25, 2005 || Kitt Peak || Spacewatch || — || align=right data-sort-value="0.96" | 960 m || 
|-id=649 bgcolor=#fefefe
| 351649 ||  || — || December 25, 2005 || Kitt Peak || Spacewatch || — || align=right | 1.1 km || 
|-id=650 bgcolor=#fefefe
| 351650 ||  || — || December 28, 2005 || Kitt Peak || Spacewatch || — || align=right data-sort-value="0.78" | 780 m || 
|-id=651 bgcolor=#fefefe
| 351651 ||  || — || December 24, 2005 || Kitt Peak || Spacewatch || — || align=right data-sort-value="0.89" | 890 m || 
|-id=652 bgcolor=#fefefe
| 351652 ||  || — || December 25, 2005 || Mount Lemmon || Mount Lemmon Survey || FLO || align=right data-sort-value="0.58" | 580 m || 
|-id=653 bgcolor=#fefefe
| 351653 ||  || — || December 25, 2005 || Kitt Peak || Spacewatch || — || align=right | 1.2 km || 
|-id=654 bgcolor=#fefefe
| 351654 ||  || — || December 25, 2005 || Catalina || CSS || PHO || align=right | 1.9 km || 
|-id=655 bgcolor=#fefefe
| 351655 ||  || — || December 27, 2005 || Kitt Peak || Spacewatch || FLO || align=right data-sort-value="0.71" | 710 m || 
|-id=656 bgcolor=#fefefe
| 351656 ||  || — || December 26, 2005 || Mount Lemmon || Mount Lemmon Survey || — || align=right data-sort-value="0.68" | 680 m || 
|-id=657 bgcolor=#fefefe
| 351657 ||  || — || December 30, 2005 || Kitt Peak || Spacewatch || — || align=right data-sort-value="0.68" | 680 m || 
|-id=658 bgcolor=#fefefe
| 351658 ||  || — || December 30, 2005 || Kitt Peak || Spacewatch || — || align=right data-sort-value="0.72" | 720 m || 
|-id=659 bgcolor=#fefefe
| 351659 ||  || — || December 30, 2005 || Kitt Peak || Spacewatch || V || align=right data-sort-value="0.82" | 820 m || 
|-id=660 bgcolor=#fefefe
| 351660 ||  || — || December 26, 2005 || Mount Lemmon || Mount Lemmon Survey || — || align=right data-sort-value="0.68" | 680 m || 
|-id=661 bgcolor=#fefefe
| 351661 ||  || — || December 27, 2005 || Kitt Peak || Spacewatch || ERI || align=right | 1.6 km || 
|-id=662 bgcolor=#fefefe
| 351662 ||  || — || December 30, 2005 || Kitt Peak || Spacewatch || — || align=right data-sort-value="0.77" | 770 m || 
|-id=663 bgcolor=#fefefe
| 351663 ||  || — || December 28, 2005 || Kitt Peak || Spacewatch || NYS || align=right data-sort-value="0.58" | 580 m || 
|-id=664 bgcolor=#FA8072
| 351664 ||  || — || January 5, 2006 || Mayhill || A. Lowe || — || align=right | 1.0 km || 
|-id=665 bgcolor=#fefefe
| 351665 ||  || — || January 4, 2006 || Kitt Peak || Spacewatch || FLO || align=right data-sort-value="0.61" | 610 m || 
|-id=666 bgcolor=#fefefe
| 351666 ||  || — || January 4, 2006 || Kitt Peak || Spacewatch || V || align=right data-sort-value="0.54" | 540 m || 
|-id=667 bgcolor=#fefefe
| 351667 ||  || — || January 5, 2006 || Socorro || LINEAR || — || align=right | 1.0 km || 
|-id=668 bgcolor=#fefefe
| 351668 ||  || — || January 4, 2006 || Kitt Peak || Spacewatch || NYS || align=right data-sort-value="0.91" | 910 m || 
|-id=669 bgcolor=#fefefe
| 351669 ||  || — || January 7, 2006 || Mount Lemmon || Mount Lemmon Survey || — || align=right | 1.0 km || 
|-id=670 bgcolor=#fefefe
| 351670 ||  || — || January 6, 2006 || Kitt Peak || Spacewatch || NYS || align=right data-sort-value="0.56" | 560 m || 
|-id=671 bgcolor=#fefefe
| 351671 ||  || — || January 5, 2006 || Kitt Peak || Spacewatch || — || align=right data-sort-value="0.75" | 750 m || 
|-id=672 bgcolor=#fefefe
| 351672 ||  || — || January 5, 2006 || Kitt Peak || Spacewatch || FLO || align=right data-sort-value="0.77" | 770 m || 
|-id=673 bgcolor=#fefefe
| 351673 ||  || — || January 7, 2006 || Mount Lemmon || Mount Lemmon Survey || — || align=right data-sort-value="0.78" | 780 m || 
|-id=674 bgcolor=#fefefe
| 351674 ||  || — || January 8, 2006 || Kitt Peak || Spacewatch || V || align=right data-sort-value="0.83" | 830 m || 
|-id=675 bgcolor=#fefefe
| 351675 ||  || — || January 8, 2006 || Mount Lemmon || Mount Lemmon Survey || PHO || align=right | 2.6 km || 
|-id=676 bgcolor=#fefefe
| 351676 ||  || — || January 7, 2006 || Kitt Peak || Spacewatch || — || align=right data-sort-value="0.82" | 820 m || 
|-id=677 bgcolor=#fefefe
| 351677 ||  || — || January 11, 2006 || Wrightwood || J. W. Young || FLO || align=right data-sort-value="0.75" | 750 m || 
|-id=678 bgcolor=#fefefe
| 351678 ||  || — || January 5, 2006 || Mount Lemmon || Mount Lemmon Survey || — || align=right data-sort-value="0.68" | 680 m || 
|-id=679 bgcolor=#fefefe
| 351679 ||  || — || January 22, 2006 || Mount Lemmon || Mount Lemmon Survey || — || align=right data-sort-value="0.77" | 770 m || 
|-id=680 bgcolor=#fefefe
| 351680 ||  || — || January 5, 2006 || Mount Lemmon || Mount Lemmon Survey || — || align=right | 1.1 km || 
|-id=681 bgcolor=#fefefe
| 351681 ||  || — || January 20, 2006 || Catalina || CSS || — || align=right data-sort-value="0.91" | 910 m || 
|-id=682 bgcolor=#fefefe
| 351682 ||  || — || January 20, 2006 || Kitt Peak || Spacewatch || V || align=right data-sort-value="0.85" | 850 m || 
|-id=683 bgcolor=#fefefe
| 351683 ||  || — || January 21, 2006 || Kitt Peak || Spacewatch || NYS || align=right data-sort-value="0.68" | 680 m || 
|-id=684 bgcolor=#fefefe
| 351684 ||  || — || January 21, 2006 || Kitt Peak || Spacewatch || — || align=right data-sort-value="0.94" | 940 m || 
|-id=685 bgcolor=#fefefe
| 351685 ||  || — || January 23, 2006 || Kitt Peak || Spacewatch || NYS || align=right | 1.8 km || 
|-id=686 bgcolor=#fefefe
| 351686 ||  || — || January 23, 2006 || Kitt Peak || Spacewatch || — || align=right data-sort-value="0.90" | 900 m || 
|-id=687 bgcolor=#fefefe
| 351687 ||  || — || January 23, 2006 || Mount Lemmon || Mount Lemmon Survey || MAS || align=right data-sort-value="0.86" | 860 m || 
|-id=688 bgcolor=#fefefe
| 351688 ||  || — || January 23, 2006 || Mount Lemmon || Mount Lemmon Survey || FLO || align=right data-sort-value="0.55" | 550 m || 
|-id=689 bgcolor=#fefefe
| 351689 ||  || — || January 23, 2006 || Kitt Peak || Spacewatch || — || align=right data-sort-value="0.89" | 890 m || 
|-id=690 bgcolor=#fefefe
| 351690 ||  || — || January 23, 2006 || Mount Lemmon || Mount Lemmon Survey || — || align=right | 1.3 km || 
|-id=691 bgcolor=#fefefe
| 351691 ||  || — || January 23, 2006 || Kitt Peak || Spacewatch || — || align=right data-sort-value="0.68" | 680 m || 
|-id=692 bgcolor=#fefefe
| 351692 ||  || — || January 23, 2006 || Mount Lemmon || Mount Lemmon Survey || NYS || align=right data-sort-value="0.66" | 660 m || 
|-id=693 bgcolor=#fefefe
| 351693 ||  || — || January 25, 2006 || Kitt Peak || Spacewatch || MAS || align=right data-sort-value="0.65" | 650 m || 
|-id=694 bgcolor=#fefefe
| 351694 ||  || — || January 25, 2006 || Kitt Peak || Spacewatch || — || align=right | 1.0 km || 
|-id=695 bgcolor=#fefefe
| 351695 ||  || — || January 25, 2006 || Kitt Peak || Spacewatch || — || align=right data-sort-value="0.78" | 780 m || 
|-id=696 bgcolor=#fefefe
| 351696 ||  || — || January 27, 2006 || Mount Lemmon || Mount Lemmon Survey || NYS || align=right data-sort-value="0.64" | 640 m || 
|-id=697 bgcolor=#fefefe
| 351697 ||  || — || January 27, 2006 || Mount Lemmon || Mount Lemmon Survey || NYS || align=right data-sort-value="0.59" | 590 m || 
|-id=698 bgcolor=#fefefe
| 351698 ||  || — || January 21, 2006 || Mount Lemmon || Mount Lemmon Survey || FLO || align=right data-sort-value="0.63" | 630 m || 
|-id=699 bgcolor=#fefefe
| 351699 ||  || — || January 23, 2006 || Mount Lemmon || Mount Lemmon Survey || — || align=right data-sort-value="0.87" | 870 m || 
|-id=700 bgcolor=#fefefe
| 351700 ||  || — || January 25, 2006 || Kitt Peak || Spacewatch || V || align=right data-sort-value="0.74" | 740 m || 
|}

351701–351800 

|-bgcolor=#fefefe
| 351701 ||  || — || January 25, 2006 || Kitt Peak || Spacewatch || NYS || align=right data-sort-value="0.83" | 830 m || 
|-id=702 bgcolor=#fefefe
| 351702 ||  || — || January 26, 2006 || Kitt Peak || Spacewatch || — || align=right data-sort-value="0.98" | 980 m || 
|-id=703 bgcolor=#d6d6d6
| 351703 ||  || — || January 26, 2006 || Mount Lemmon || Mount Lemmon Survey || 3:2 || align=right | 4.0 km || 
|-id=704 bgcolor=#fefefe
| 351704 ||  || — || January 26, 2006 || Kitt Peak || Spacewatch || MAS || align=right data-sort-value="0.68" | 680 m || 
|-id=705 bgcolor=#fefefe
| 351705 ||  || — || January 28, 2006 || Kitt Peak || Spacewatch || — || align=right | 1.1 km || 
|-id=706 bgcolor=#fefefe
| 351706 ||  || — || January 30, 2006 || Kitt Peak || Spacewatch || — || align=right data-sort-value="0.90" | 900 m || 
|-id=707 bgcolor=#fefefe
| 351707 ||  || — || January 24, 2006 || Anderson Mesa || LONEOS || — || align=right | 1.5 km || 
|-id=708 bgcolor=#fefefe
| 351708 ||  || — || January 27, 2006 || Mount Lemmon || Mount Lemmon Survey || — || align=right data-sort-value="0.75" | 750 m || 
|-id=709 bgcolor=#fefefe
| 351709 ||  || — || January 27, 2006 || Mount Lemmon || Mount Lemmon Survey || — || align=right data-sort-value="0.82" | 820 m || 
|-id=710 bgcolor=#fefefe
| 351710 ||  || — || January 30, 2006 || Kitt Peak || Spacewatch || MAS || align=right data-sort-value="0.73" | 730 m || 
|-id=711 bgcolor=#fefefe
| 351711 ||  || — || January 30, 2006 || Kitt Peak || Spacewatch || MAS || align=right data-sort-value="0.75" | 750 m || 
|-id=712 bgcolor=#d6d6d6
| 351712 ||  || — || January 30, 2006 || Kitt Peak || Spacewatch || 3:2 || align=right | 5.0 km || 
|-id=713 bgcolor=#fefefe
| 351713 ||  || — || January 30, 2006 || Kitt Peak || Spacewatch || — || align=right data-sort-value="0.95" | 950 m || 
|-id=714 bgcolor=#fefefe
| 351714 ||  || — || January 30, 2006 || Catalina || CSS || — || align=right | 1.2 km || 
|-id=715 bgcolor=#fefefe
| 351715 ||  || — || January 31, 2006 || Kitt Peak || Spacewatch || — || align=right | 1.0 km || 
|-id=716 bgcolor=#fefefe
| 351716 ||  || — || January 31, 2006 || Kitt Peak || Spacewatch || NYS || align=right data-sort-value="0.76" | 760 m || 
|-id=717 bgcolor=#fefefe
| 351717 ||  || — || January 31, 2006 || Kitt Peak || Spacewatch || NYS || align=right data-sort-value="0.71" | 710 m || 
|-id=718 bgcolor=#fefefe
| 351718 ||  || — || January 31, 2006 || Kitt Peak || Spacewatch || V || align=right data-sort-value="0.74" | 740 m || 
|-id=719 bgcolor=#fefefe
| 351719 ||  || — || January 31, 2006 || Kitt Peak || Spacewatch || — || align=right data-sort-value="0.83" | 830 m || 
|-id=720 bgcolor=#fefefe
| 351720 ||  || — || January 31, 2006 || Kitt Peak || Spacewatch || — || align=right data-sort-value="0.79" | 790 m || 
|-id=721 bgcolor=#fefefe
| 351721 ||  || — || January 31, 2006 || Kitt Peak || Spacewatch || MAS || align=right data-sort-value="0.75" | 750 m || 
|-id=722 bgcolor=#E9E9E9
| 351722 ||  || — || August 8, 2004 || Palomar || NEAT || — || align=right | 1.4 km || 
|-id=723 bgcolor=#fefefe
| 351723 ||  || — || January 23, 2006 || Kitt Peak || Spacewatch || — || align=right | 2.4 km || 
|-id=724 bgcolor=#fefefe
| 351724 ||  || — || January 30, 2006 || Kitt Peak || Spacewatch || MAS || align=right data-sort-value="0.82" | 820 m || 
|-id=725 bgcolor=#fefefe
| 351725 ||  || — || January 30, 2006 || Kitt Peak || Spacewatch || ERI || align=right | 2.3 km || 
|-id=726 bgcolor=#fefefe
| 351726 ||  || — || February 1, 2006 || Mount Lemmon || Mount Lemmon Survey || NYS || align=right data-sort-value="0.55" | 550 m || 
|-id=727 bgcolor=#fefefe
| 351727 ||  || — || February 2, 2006 || Kitt Peak || Spacewatch || NYS || align=right data-sort-value="0.52" | 520 m || 
|-id=728 bgcolor=#fefefe
| 351728 ||  || — || February 2, 2006 || Mount Lemmon || Mount Lemmon Survey || FLO || align=right data-sort-value="0.73" | 730 m || 
|-id=729 bgcolor=#fefefe
| 351729 ||  || — || February 2, 2006 || Mount Lemmon || Mount Lemmon Survey || NYS || align=right data-sort-value="0.72" | 720 m || 
|-id=730 bgcolor=#fefefe
| 351730 ||  || — || February 3, 2006 || Kitt Peak || Spacewatch || — || align=right data-sort-value="0.76" | 760 m || 
|-id=731 bgcolor=#fefefe
| 351731 ||  || — || February 3, 2006 || Socorro || LINEAR || ERI || align=right | 1.7 km || 
|-id=732 bgcolor=#fefefe
| 351732 ||  || — || February 2, 2006 || Catalina || CSS || — || align=right | 1.0 km || 
|-id=733 bgcolor=#d6d6d6
| 351733 ||  || — || February 1, 2006 || Kitt Peak || Spacewatch || SHU3:2 || align=right | 6.6 km || 
|-id=734 bgcolor=#fefefe
| 351734 ||  || — || February 20, 2006 || Catalina || CSS || EUT || align=right data-sort-value="0.72" | 720 m || 
|-id=735 bgcolor=#fefefe
| 351735 ||  || — || February 20, 2006 || Catalina || CSS || — || align=right data-sort-value="0.80" | 800 m || 
|-id=736 bgcolor=#fefefe
| 351736 ||  || — || February 21, 2006 || Catalina || CSS || V || align=right data-sort-value="0.81" | 810 m || 
|-id=737 bgcolor=#fefefe
| 351737 ||  || — || February 20, 2006 || Kitt Peak || Spacewatch || FLO || align=right data-sort-value="0.78" | 780 m || 
|-id=738 bgcolor=#fefefe
| 351738 ||  || — || May 5, 2003 || Kitt Peak || Spacewatch || — || align=right | 1.1 km || 
|-id=739 bgcolor=#fefefe
| 351739 ||  || — || February 20, 2006 || Kitt Peak || Spacewatch || MAS || align=right data-sort-value="0.71" | 710 m || 
|-id=740 bgcolor=#fefefe
| 351740 ||  || — || February 24, 2006 || Kitt Peak || Spacewatch || — || align=right | 1.6 km || 
|-id=741 bgcolor=#fefefe
| 351741 ||  || — || February 24, 2006 || Kitt Peak || Spacewatch || FLO || align=right data-sort-value="0.66" | 660 m || 
|-id=742 bgcolor=#fefefe
| 351742 ||  || — || February 24, 2006 || Catalina || CSS || H || align=right data-sort-value="0.92" | 920 m || 
|-id=743 bgcolor=#fefefe
| 351743 ||  || — || February 23, 2006 || Kitt Peak || Spacewatch || V || align=right data-sort-value="0.93" | 930 m || 
|-id=744 bgcolor=#fefefe
| 351744 ||  || — || February 24, 2006 || Kitt Peak || Spacewatch || NYS || align=right data-sort-value="0.65" | 650 m || 
|-id=745 bgcolor=#fefefe
| 351745 ||  || — || February 25, 2006 || Kitt Peak || Spacewatch || NYS || align=right data-sort-value="0.70" | 700 m || 
|-id=746 bgcolor=#fefefe
| 351746 ||  || — || February 25, 2006 || Kitt Peak || Spacewatch || NYS || align=right data-sort-value="0.73" | 730 m || 
|-id=747 bgcolor=#fefefe
| 351747 ||  || — || February 27, 2006 || Mount Lemmon || Mount Lemmon Survey || V || align=right data-sort-value="0.83" | 830 m || 
|-id=748 bgcolor=#fefefe
| 351748 ||  || — || February 27, 2006 || Kitt Peak || Spacewatch || — || align=right data-sort-value="0.94" | 940 m || 
|-id=749 bgcolor=#fefefe
| 351749 ||  || — || February 22, 2006 || Anderson Mesa || LONEOS || — || align=right | 1.0 km || 
|-id=750 bgcolor=#fefefe
| 351750 ||  || — || February 25, 2006 || Kitt Peak || Spacewatch || NYS || align=right data-sort-value="0.63" | 630 m || 
|-id=751 bgcolor=#fefefe
| 351751 ||  || — || February 25, 2006 || Kitt Peak || Spacewatch || — || align=right data-sort-value="0.96" | 960 m || 
|-id=752 bgcolor=#fefefe
| 351752 ||  || — || February 25, 2006 || Kitt Peak || Spacewatch || NYS || align=right data-sort-value="0.63" | 630 m || 
|-id=753 bgcolor=#fefefe
| 351753 ||  || — || February 25, 2006 || Kitt Peak || Spacewatch || NYS || align=right data-sort-value="0.63" | 630 m || 
|-id=754 bgcolor=#fefefe
| 351754 ||  || — || February 25, 2006 || Kitt Peak || Spacewatch || NYS || align=right data-sort-value="0.58" | 580 m || 
|-id=755 bgcolor=#fefefe
| 351755 ||  || — || February 27, 2006 || Kitt Peak || Spacewatch || NYS || align=right data-sort-value="0.71" | 710 m || 
|-id=756 bgcolor=#fefefe
| 351756 ||  || — || February 27, 2006 || Kitt Peak || Spacewatch || MAS || align=right data-sort-value="0.64" | 640 m || 
|-id=757 bgcolor=#fefefe
| 351757 ||  || — || February 27, 2006 || Kitt Peak || Spacewatch || — || align=right data-sort-value="0.91" | 910 m || 
|-id=758 bgcolor=#fefefe
| 351758 ||  || — || February 27, 2006 || Mount Lemmon || Mount Lemmon Survey || — || align=right | 1.9 km || 
|-id=759 bgcolor=#fefefe
| 351759 ||  || — || February 27, 2006 || Kitt Peak || Spacewatch || NYS || align=right data-sort-value="0.83" | 830 m || 
|-id=760 bgcolor=#fefefe
| 351760 ||  || — || February 20, 2006 || Kitt Peak || Spacewatch || NYS || align=right data-sort-value="0.54" | 540 m || 
|-id=761 bgcolor=#fefefe
| 351761 ||  || — || February 23, 2006 || Anderson Mesa || LONEOS || — || align=right | 1.3 km || 
|-id=762 bgcolor=#fefefe
| 351762 ||  || — || January 23, 2006 || Kitt Peak || Spacewatch || NYS || align=right data-sort-value="0.57" | 570 m || 
|-id=763 bgcolor=#fefefe
| 351763 ||  || — || February 25, 2006 || Kitt Peak || Spacewatch || — || align=right | 1.1 km || 
|-id=764 bgcolor=#fefefe
| 351764 ||  || — || February 24, 2006 || Kitt Peak || Spacewatch || NYS || align=right data-sort-value="0.74" | 740 m || 
|-id=765 bgcolor=#fefefe
| 351765 ||  || — || February 24, 2006 || Mount Lemmon || Mount Lemmon Survey || V || align=right data-sort-value="0.73" | 730 m || 
|-id=766 bgcolor=#fefefe
| 351766 ||  || — || March 2, 2006 || Kitt Peak || Spacewatch || NYS || align=right data-sort-value="0.69" | 690 m || 
|-id=767 bgcolor=#fefefe
| 351767 ||  || — || March 2, 2006 || Kitt Peak || Spacewatch || — || align=right | 1.0 km || 
|-id=768 bgcolor=#fefefe
| 351768 ||  || — || March 3, 2006 || Kitt Peak || Spacewatch || — || align=right data-sort-value="0.96" | 960 m || 
|-id=769 bgcolor=#fefefe
| 351769 ||  || — || March 4, 2006 || Kitt Peak || Spacewatch || — || align=right | 1.0 km || 
|-id=770 bgcolor=#fefefe
| 351770 ||  || — || March 5, 2006 || Kitt Peak || Spacewatch || — || align=right data-sort-value="0.88" | 880 m || 
|-id=771 bgcolor=#fefefe
| 351771 ||  || — || March 5, 2006 || Kitt Peak || Spacewatch || NYS || align=right data-sort-value="0.66" | 660 m || 
|-id=772 bgcolor=#fefefe
| 351772 ||  || — || March 2, 2006 || Kitt Peak || M. W. Buie || MAS || align=right data-sort-value="0.78" | 780 m || 
|-id=773 bgcolor=#fefefe
| 351773 ||  || — || March 23, 2006 || Kitt Peak || Spacewatch || NYS || align=right data-sort-value="0.76" | 760 m || 
|-id=774 bgcolor=#fefefe
| 351774 ||  || — || March 26, 2006 || Mount Lemmon || Mount Lemmon Survey || MAS || align=right data-sort-value="0.86" | 860 m || 
|-id=775 bgcolor=#fefefe
| 351775 ||  || — || April 2, 2006 || Kitt Peak || Spacewatch || NYS || align=right data-sort-value="0.67" | 670 m || 
|-id=776 bgcolor=#fefefe
| 351776 ||  || — || April 2, 2006 || Kitt Peak || Spacewatch || — || align=right data-sort-value="0.94" | 940 m || 
|-id=777 bgcolor=#fefefe
| 351777 ||  || — || April 2, 2006 || Kitt Peak || Spacewatch || V || align=right data-sort-value="0.85" | 850 m || 
|-id=778 bgcolor=#fefefe
| 351778 ||  || — || April 2, 2006 || Mount Lemmon || Mount Lemmon Survey || — || align=right data-sort-value="0.83" | 830 m || 
|-id=779 bgcolor=#E9E9E9
| 351779 ||  || — || April 8, 2006 || Kitt Peak || Spacewatch || — || align=right | 2.1 km || 
|-id=780 bgcolor=#fefefe
| 351780 ||  || — || April 18, 2006 || Kitt Peak || Spacewatch || — || align=right data-sort-value="0.85" | 850 m || 
|-id=781 bgcolor=#fefefe
| 351781 ||  || — || April 18, 2006 || Kitt Peak || Spacewatch || V || align=right data-sort-value="0.91" | 910 m || 
|-id=782 bgcolor=#fefefe
| 351782 ||  || — || April 18, 2006 || Kitt Peak || Spacewatch || — || align=right data-sort-value="0.91" | 910 m || 
|-id=783 bgcolor=#fefefe
| 351783 ||  || — || April 18, 2006 || Palomar || NEAT || — || align=right | 1.0 km || 
|-id=784 bgcolor=#E9E9E9
| 351784 ||  || — || April 19, 2006 || Kitt Peak || Spacewatch || — || align=right | 2.6 km || 
|-id=785 bgcolor=#fefefe
| 351785 Reguly ||  ||  || April 21, 2006 || Piszkéstető || K. Sárneczky || NYS || align=right data-sort-value="0.65" | 650 m || 
|-id=786 bgcolor=#fefefe
| 351786 ||  || — || April 20, 2006 || Kitt Peak || Spacewatch || — || align=right | 1.2 km || 
|-id=787 bgcolor=#fefefe
| 351787 ||  || — || April 18, 2006 || Palomar || NEAT || — || align=right | 1.3 km || 
|-id=788 bgcolor=#E9E9E9
| 351788 ||  || — || March 25, 2006 || Kitt Peak || Spacewatch || — || align=right data-sort-value="0.86" | 860 m || 
|-id=789 bgcolor=#fefefe
| 351789 ||  || — || April 24, 2006 || Mount Lemmon || Mount Lemmon Survey || MAS || align=right data-sort-value="0.98" | 980 m || 
|-id=790 bgcolor=#E9E9E9
| 351790 ||  || — || April 20, 2006 || Kitt Peak || Spacewatch || — || align=right | 1.1 km || 
|-id=791 bgcolor=#E9E9E9
| 351791 ||  || — || April 24, 2006 || Nyukasa || A. Nakanishi, F. Futaba || — || align=right | 2.1 km || 
|-id=792 bgcolor=#fefefe
| 351792 ||  || — || April 19, 2006 || Catalina || CSS || — || align=right data-sort-value="0.96" | 960 m || 
|-id=793 bgcolor=#E9E9E9
| 351793 ||  || — || April 25, 2006 || Kitt Peak || Spacewatch || — || align=right | 1.1 km || 
|-id=794 bgcolor=#E9E9E9
| 351794 ||  || — || April 25, 2006 || Kitt Peak || Spacewatch || — || align=right | 2.0 km || 
|-id=795 bgcolor=#E9E9E9
| 351795 ||  || — || April 26, 2006 || Kitt Peak || Spacewatch || — || align=right | 2.1 km || 
|-id=796 bgcolor=#fefefe
| 351796 ||  || — || April 27, 2006 || Cerro Tololo || M. W. Buie || — || align=right | 1.0 km || 
|-id=797 bgcolor=#fefefe
| 351797 ||  || — || May 3, 2006 || Mount Lemmon || Mount Lemmon Survey || NYS || align=right data-sort-value="0.69" | 690 m || 
|-id=798 bgcolor=#fefefe
| 351798 ||  || — || May 2, 2006 || Mount Lemmon || Mount Lemmon Survey || — || align=right | 1.0 km || 
|-id=799 bgcolor=#E9E9E9
| 351799 ||  || — || May 8, 2006 || Mount Lemmon || Mount Lemmon Survey || — || align=right | 2.8 km || 
|-id=800 bgcolor=#E9E9E9
| 351800 ||  || — || April 18, 2006 || Catalina || CSS || MAR || align=right | 1.4 km || 
|}

351801–351900 

|-bgcolor=#E9E9E9
| 351801 ||  || — || April 6, 2006 || Siding Spring || SSS || — || align=right | 1.6 km || 
|-id=802 bgcolor=#fefefe
| 351802 ||  || — || May 20, 2006 || Kitt Peak || Spacewatch || V || align=right data-sort-value="0.93" | 930 m || 
|-id=803 bgcolor=#fefefe
| 351803 ||  || — || May 21, 2006 || Kitt Peak || Spacewatch || LCI || align=right | 1.4 km || 
|-id=804 bgcolor=#fefefe
| 351804 ||  || — || May 21, 2006 || Mount Lemmon || Mount Lemmon Survey || NYS || align=right data-sort-value="0.88" | 880 m || 
|-id=805 bgcolor=#E9E9E9
| 351805 ||  || — || May 22, 2006 || Kitt Peak || Spacewatch || — || align=right data-sort-value="0.92" | 920 m || 
|-id=806 bgcolor=#E9E9E9
| 351806 ||  || — || May 20, 2006 || Mount Lemmon || Mount Lemmon Survey || — || align=right | 1.9 km || 
|-id=807 bgcolor=#E9E9E9
| 351807 ||  || — || May 23, 2006 || Kitt Peak || Spacewatch || — || align=right | 1.6 km || 
|-id=808 bgcolor=#E9E9E9
| 351808 ||  || — || May 27, 2006 || Siding Spring || SSS || — || align=right | 3.5 km || 
|-id=809 bgcolor=#E9E9E9
| 351809 ||  || — || May 25, 2006 || Kitt Peak || Spacewatch || — || align=right | 3.7 km || 
|-id=810 bgcolor=#fefefe
| 351810 ||  || — || May 24, 2006 || Palomar || NEAT || MAS || align=right data-sort-value="0.90" | 900 m || 
|-id=811 bgcolor=#E9E9E9
| 351811 ||  || — || June 11, 2006 || Palomar || NEAT || — || align=right | 1.7 km || 
|-id=812 bgcolor=#E9E9E9
| 351812 ||  || — || June 7, 2006 || Siding Spring || SSS || — || align=right | 2.1 km || 
|-id=813 bgcolor=#E9E9E9
| 351813 ||  || — || June 19, 2006 || Socorro || LINEAR || MIT || align=right | 2.5 km || 
|-id=814 bgcolor=#E9E9E9
| 351814 ||  || — || July 18, 2006 || Mount Lemmon || Mount Lemmon Survey || ADE || align=right | 3.1 km || 
|-id=815 bgcolor=#FFC2E0
| 351815 ||  || — || July 30, 2006 || Siding Spring || SSS || AMO || align=right data-sort-value="0.75" | 750 m || 
|-id=816 bgcolor=#d6d6d6
| 351816 ||  || — || July 21, 2006 || Mount Lemmon || Mount Lemmon Survey || EUP || align=right | 3.3 km || 
|-id=817 bgcolor=#E9E9E9
| 351817 ||  || — || August 12, 2006 || Palomar || NEAT || — || align=right | 2.4 km || 
|-id=818 bgcolor=#E9E9E9
| 351818 ||  || — || August 12, 2006 || Palomar || NEAT || — || align=right | 2.0 km || 
|-id=819 bgcolor=#E9E9E9
| 351819 ||  || — || August 13, 2006 || Palomar || NEAT || — || align=right | 1.4 km || 
|-id=820 bgcolor=#E9E9E9
| 351820 ||  || — || August 13, 2006 || Palomar || NEAT || — || align=right | 2.2 km || 
|-id=821 bgcolor=#d6d6d6
| 351821 ||  || — || August 13, 2006 || Palomar || NEAT || — || align=right | 3.4 km || 
|-id=822 bgcolor=#E9E9E9
| 351822 ||  || — || August 13, 2006 || Palomar || NEAT || HNS || align=right | 1.5 km || 
|-id=823 bgcolor=#E9E9E9
| 351823 ||  || — || August 15, 2006 || Palomar || NEAT || DOR || align=right | 3.1 km || 
|-id=824 bgcolor=#E9E9E9
| 351824 ||  || — || August 15, 2006 || Palomar || NEAT || PAD || align=right | 2.0 km || 
|-id=825 bgcolor=#E9E9E9
| 351825 ||  || — || August 15, 2006 || Siding Spring || SSS || — || align=right | 3.0 km || 
|-id=826 bgcolor=#E9E9E9
| 351826 ||  || — || August 14, 2006 || Palomar || NEAT || — || align=right | 1.9 km || 
|-id=827 bgcolor=#E9E9E9
| 351827 ||  || — || August 19, 2006 || Kitt Peak || Spacewatch || — || align=right | 2.9 km || 
|-id=828 bgcolor=#fefefe
| 351828 ||  || — || August 21, 2006 || Socorro || LINEAR || H || align=right data-sort-value="0.99" | 990 m || 
|-id=829 bgcolor=#fefefe
| 351829 ||  || — || August 17, 2006 || Palomar || NEAT || H || align=right data-sort-value="0.95" | 950 m || 
|-id=830 bgcolor=#E9E9E9
| 351830 ||  || — || August 19, 2006 || Palomar || NEAT || — || align=right | 2.2 km || 
|-id=831 bgcolor=#E9E9E9
| 351831 ||  || — || August 22, 2006 || Palomar || NEAT || — || align=right | 1.9 km || 
|-id=832 bgcolor=#E9E9E9
| 351832 ||  || — || August 23, 2006 || Socorro || LINEAR || — || align=right | 3.2 km || 
|-id=833 bgcolor=#d6d6d6
| 351833 ||  || — || August 21, 2006 || Kitt Peak || Spacewatch || — || align=right | 2.6 km || 
|-id=834 bgcolor=#d6d6d6
| 351834 ||  || — || August 16, 2006 || Palomar || NEAT || BRA || align=right | 1.7 km || 
|-id=835 bgcolor=#fefefe
| 351835 ||  || — || August 25, 2006 || Socorro || LINEAR || H || align=right | 1.2 km || 
|-id=836 bgcolor=#E9E9E9
| 351836 ||  || — || August 19, 2006 || Kitt Peak || Spacewatch || — || align=right | 1.7 km || 
|-id=837 bgcolor=#E9E9E9
| 351837 ||  || — || August 19, 2006 || Kitt Peak || Spacewatch || — || align=right | 2.7 km || 
|-id=838 bgcolor=#E9E9E9
| 351838 ||  || — || August 27, 2006 || Kitt Peak || Spacewatch || HOF || align=right | 3.1 km || 
|-id=839 bgcolor=#E9E9E9
| 351839 ||  || — || August 30, 2006 || Mayhill || A. Lowe || — || align=right | 4.1 km || 
|-id=840 bgcolor=#E9E9E9
| 351840 ||  || — || August 27, 2006 || Anderson Mesa || LONEOS || — || align=right | 2.7 km || 
|-id=841 bgcolor=#d6d6d6
| 351841 ||  || — || August 29, 2006 || Kitt Peak || Spacewatch || — || align=right | 3.6 km || 
|-id=842 bgcolor=#E9E9E9
| 351842 ||  || — || August 29, 2006 || Anderson Mesa || LONEOS || — || align=right | 2.6 km || 
|-id=843 bgcolor=#d6d6d6
| 351843 ||  || — || August 16, 2006 || Palomar || NEAT || — || align=right | 3.2 km || 
|-id=844 bgcolor=#E9E9E9
| 351844 ||  || — || August 17, 2006 || Palomar || NEAT || PAD || align=right | 2.1 km || 
|-id=845 bgcolor=#E9E9E9
| 351845 ||  || — || August 19, 2006 || Kitt Peak || Spacewatch || NEM || align=right | 2.3 km || 
|-id=846 bgcolor=#E9E9E9
| 351846 ||  || — || August 23, 2006 || Cerro Tololo || M. W. Buie || — || align=right | 2.7 km || 
|-id=847 bgcolor=#E9E9E9
| 351847 ||  || — || September 14, 2006 || Eskridge || Farpoint Obs. || — || align=right | 3.5 km || 
|-id=848 bgcolor=#E9E9E9
| 351848 ||  || — || September 12, 2006 || Catalina || CSS || PAD || align=right | 2.2 km || 
|-id=849 bgcolor=#d6d6d6
| 351849 ||  || — || September 15, 2006 || Kitt Peak || Spacewatch || — || align=right | 2.8 km || 
|-id=850 bgcolor=#d6d6d6
| 351850 ||  || — || September 11, 2006 || Catalina || CSS || — || align=right | 3.2 km || 
|-id=851 bgcolor=#d6d6d6
| 351851 ||  || — || September 13, 2006 || Palomar || NEAT || Tj (2.99) || align=right | 2.8 km || 
|-id=852 bgcolor=#E9E9E9
| 351852 ||  || — || September 15, 2006 || Kitt Peak || Spacewatch || — || align=right | 2.5 km || 
|-id=853 bgcolor=#E9E9E9
| 351853 ||  || — || September 15, 2006 || Kitt Peak || Spacewatch || WIT || align=right data-sort-value="0.96" | 960 m || 
|-id=854 bgcolor=#E9E9E9
| 351854 ||  || — || September 15, 2006 || Kitt Peak || Spacewatch || WIT || align=right | 1.2 km || 
|-id=855 bgcolor=#E9E9E9
| 351855 ||  || — || September 12, 2006 || Catalina || CSS || — || align=right | 2.6 km || 
|-id=856 bgcolor=#d6d6d6
| 351856 ||  || — || September 14, 2006 || Kitt Peak || Spacewatch || — || align=right | 2.2 km || 
|-id=857 bgcolor=#d6d6d6
| 351857 ||  || — || September 15, 2006 || Kitt Peak || Spacewatch || — || align=right | 2.3 km || 
|-id=858 bgcolor=#d6d6d6
| 351858 ||  || — || September 15, 2006 || Kitt Peak || Spacewatch || — || align=right | 2.4 km || 
|-id=859 bgcolor=#d6d6d6
| 351859 ||  || — || September 14, 2006 || Jarnac || Jarnac Obs. || — || align=right | 3.4 km || 
|-id=860 bgcolor=#d6d6d6
| 351860 ||  || — || September 15, 2006 || Kitt Peak || Spacewatch || — || align=right | 2.4 km || 
|-id=861 bgcolor=#E9E9E9
| 351861 ||  || — || September 17, 2006 || Catalina || CSS || AGN || align=right | 1.5 km || 
|-id=862 bgcolor=#d6d6d6
| 351862 ||  || — || July 22, 2006 || Mount Lemmon || Mount Lemmon Survey || — || align=right | 2.4 km || 
|-id=863 bgcolor=#d6d6d6
| 351863 ||  || — || September 16, 2006 || Catalina || CSS || — || align=right | 2.8 km || 
|-id=864 bgcolor=#d6d6d6
| 351864 ||  || — || September 16, 2006 || Kitt Peak || Spacewatch || — || align=right | 2.9 km || 
|-id=865 bgcolor=#d6d6d6
| 351865 ||  || — || September 16, 2006 || Catalina || CSS || LIX || align=right | 3.5 km || 
|-id=866 bgcolor=#E9E9E9
| 351866 ||  || — || September 16, 2006 || Catalina || CSS || — || align=right | 2.9 km || 
|-id=867 bgcolor=#d6d6d6
| 351867 ||  || — || September 17, 2006 || Kitt Peak || Spacewatch || — || align=right | 2.2 km || 
|-id=868 bgcolor=#fefefe
| 351868 ||  || — || September 18, 2006 || Kitt Peak || Spacewatch || H || align=right data-sort-value="0.96" | 960 m || 
|-id=869 bgcolor=#d6d6d6
| 351869 ||  || — || September 18, 2006 || Catalina || CSS || — || align=right | 3.5 km || 
|-id=870 bgcolor=#d6d6d6
| 351870 ||  || — || September 16, 2006 || Palomar || NEAT || EOS || align=right | 2.3 km || 
|-id=871 bgcolor=#d6d6d6
| 351871 ||  || — || September 19, 2006 || Kitt Peak || Spacewatch || — || align=right | 2.5 km || 
|-id=872 bgcolor=#fefefe
| 351872 ||  || — || September 19, 2006 || Kitt Peak || Spacewatch || H || align=right | 1.0 km || 
|-id=873 bgcolor=#d6d6d6
| 351873 ||  || — || September 21, 2006 || Kanab || E. E. Sheridan || 628 || align=right | 1.7 km || 
|-id=874 bgcolor=#E9E9E9
| 351874 ||  || — || September 18, 2006 || Kitt Peak || Spacewatch || AGN || align=right | 1.4 km || 
|-id=875 bgcolor=#d6d6d6
| 351875 ||  || — || September 18, 2006 || Kitt Peak || Spacewatch || — || align=right | 2.7 km || 
|-id=876 bgcolor=#d6d6d6
| 351876 ||  || — || September 18, 2006 || Kitt Peak || Spacewatch || — || align=right | 3.2 km || 
|-id=877 bgcolor=#E9E9E9
| 351877 ||  || — || August 19, 2001 || Cerro Tololo || M. W. Buie || AST || align=right | 1.6 km || 
|-id=878 bgcolor=#d6d6d6
| 351878 ||  || — || September 18, 2006 || Kitt Peak || Spacewatch || — || align=right | 2.3 km || 
|-id=879 bgcolor=#d6d6d6
| 351879 ||  || — || March 7, 2003 || Apache Point || SDSS || — || align=right | 4.4 km || 
|-id=880 bgcolor=#d6d6d6
| 351880 ||  || — || September 17, 2006 || Catalina || CSS || EUP || align=right | 4.5 km || 
|-id=881 bgcolor=#d6d6d6
| 351881 ||  || — || September 21, 2006 || Anderson Mesa || LONEOS || — || align=right | 2.7 km || 
|-id=882 bgcolor=#E9E9E9
| 351882 ||  || — || September 21, 2006 || Anderson Mesa || LONEOS || — || align=right | 2.7 km || 
|-id=883 bgcolor=#d6d6d6
| 351883 ||  || — || September 19, 2006 || Kitt Peak || Spacewatch || KOR || align=right | 1.4 km || 
|-id=884 bgcolor=#d6d6d6
| 351884 ||  || — || September 19, 2006 || Kitt Peak || Spacewatch || — || align=right | 2.3 km || 
|-id=885 bgcolor=#fefefe
| 351885 ||  || — || September 25, 2006 || Kitt Peak || Spacewatch || H || align=right data-sort-value="0.84" | 840 m || 
|-id=886 bgcolor=#d6d6d6
| 351886 ||  || — || September 26, 2006 || Kitt Peak || Spacewatch || — || align=right | 2.4 km || 
|-id=887 bgcolor=#E9E9E9
| 351887 ||  || — || September 26, 2006 || Mount Lemmon || Mount Lemmon Survey || — || align=right | 1.8 km || 
|-id=888 bgcolor=#d6d6d6
| 351888 ||  || — || September 25, 2006 || Kitt Peak || Spacewatch || KAR || align=right | 1.2 km || 
|-id=889 bgcolor=#E9E9E9
| 351889 ||  || — || September 26, 2006 || Mount Lemmon || Mount Lemmon Survey || — || align=right | 2.5 km || 
|-id=890 bgcolor=#d6d6d6
| 351890 ||  || — || September 27, 2006 || Kitt Peak || Spacewatch || — || align=right | 2.8 km || 
|-id=891 bgcolor=#d6d6d6
| 351891 ||  || — || September 27, 2006 || Kitt Peak || Spacewatch || — || align=right | 2.1 km || 
|-id=892 bgcolor=#d6d6d6
| 351892 ||  || — || September 17, 2006 || Kitt Peak || Spacewatch || — || align=right | 2.9 km || 
|-id=893 bgcolor=#d6d6d6
| 351893 ||  || — || September 25, 2006 || Mount Lemmon || Mount Lemmon Survey || EOS || align=right | 2.0 km || 
|-id=894 bgcolor=#d6d6d6
| 351894 ||  || — || July 21, 2006 || Mount Lemmon || Mount Lemmon Survey || — || align=right | 3.0 km || 
|-id=895 bgcolor=#d6d6d6
| 351895 ||  || — || September 26, 2006 || Kitt Peak || Spacewatch || — || align=right | 2.1 km || 
|-id=896 bgcolor=#d6d6d6
| 351896 ||  || — || September 26, 2006 || Kitt Peak || Spacewatch || — || align=right | 2.8 km || 
|-id=897 bgcolor=#d6d6d6
| 351897 ||  || — || September 26, 2006 || Kitt Peak || Spacewatch || KOR || align=right | 1.3 km || 
|-id=898 bgcolor=#d6d6d6
| 351898 ||  || — || September 26, 2006 || Kitt Peak || Spacewatch || KOR || align=right | 1.2 km || 
|-id=899 bgcolor=#d6d6d6
| 351899 ||  || — || September 26, 2006 || Kitt Peak || Spacewatch || — || align=right | 2.3 km || 
|-id=900 bgcolor=#d6d6d6
| 351900 ||  || — || September 26, 2006 || Kitt Peak || Spacewatch || — || align=right | 3.4 km || 
|}

351901–352000 

|-bgcolor=#d6d6d6
| 351901 ||  || — || September 26, 2006 || Mount Lemmon || Mount Lemmon Survey || TIR || align=right | 2.8 km || 
|-id=902 bgcolor=#d6d6d6
| 351902 ||  || — || September 26, 2006 || Mount Lemmon || Mount Lemmon Survey || — || align=right | 2.1 km || 
|-id=903 bgcolor=#d6d6d6
| 351903 ||  || — || September 24, 2006 || Catalina || CSS || — || align=right | 4.1 km || 
|-id=904 bgcolor=#fefefe
| 351904 ||  || — || September 25, 2006 || Catalina || CSS || H || align=right | 1.0 km || 
|-id=905 bgcolor=#d6d6d6
| 351905 ||  || — || September 27, 2006 || Kitt Peak || Spacewatch || — || align=right | 2.2 km || 
|-id=906 bgcolor=#d6d6d6
| 351906 ||  || — || September 27, 2006 || Kitt Peak || Spacewatch || — || align=right | 2.9 km || 
|-id=907 bgcolor=#d6d6d6
| 351907 ||  || — || September 27, 2006 || Kitt Peak || Spacewatch || CHA || align=right | 1.6 km || 
|-id=908 bgcolor=#d6d6d6
| 351908 ||  || — || September 28, 2006 || Mount Lemmon || Mount Lemmon Survey || — || align=right | 2.7 km || 
|-id=909 bgcolor=#d6d6d6
| 351909 ||  || — || September 30, 2006 || Catalina || CSS || LIX || align=right | 4.5 km || 
|-id=910 bgcolor=#d6d6d6
| 351910 ||  || — || September 30, 2006 || Mount Lemmon || Mount Lemmon Survey || EOS || align=right | 2.1 km || 
|-id=911 bgcolor=#d6d6d6
| 351911 ||  || — || September 30, 2006 || Catalina || CSS || ALA || align=right | 3.4 km || 
|-id=912 bgcolor=#d6d6d6
| 351912 ||  || — || September 30, 2006 || Catalina || CSS || EUP || align=right | 6.2 km || 
|-id=913 bgcolor=#d6d6d6
| 351913 ||  || — || September 30, 2006 || Kitt Peak || Spacewatch || — || align=right | 3.1 km || 
|-id=914 bgcolor=#d6d6d6
| 351914 ||  || — || September 16, 2006 || Apache Point || A. C. Becker || — || align=right | 3.0 km || 
|-id=915 bgcolor=#d6d6d6
| 351915 ||  || — || September 16, 2006 || Apache Point || A. C. Becker || — || align=right | 2.9 km || 
|-id=916 bgcolor=#d6d6d6
| 351916 ||  || — || September 17, 2006 || Apache Point || A. C. Becker || EOS || align=right | 1.9 km || 
|-id=917 bgcolor=#d6d6d6
| 351917 ||  || — || September 28, 2006 || Apache Point || A. C. Becker || — || align=right | 2.7 km || 
|-id=918 bgcolor=#d6d6d6
| 351918 ||  || — || September 29, 2006 || Apache Point || A. C. Becker || — || align=right | 2.7 km || 
|-id=919 bgcolor=#d6d6d6
| 351919 ||  || — || September 29, 2006 || Apache Point || A. C. Becker || — || align=right | 3.2 km || 
|-id=920 bgcolor=#d6d6d6
| 351920 ||  || — || September 30, 2006 || Apache Point || A. C. Becker || — || align=right | 2.3 km || 
|-id=921 bgcolor=#d6d6d6
| 351921 ||  || — || September 30, 2006 || Apache Point || A. C. Becker || — || align=right | 2.4 km || 
|-id=922 bgcolor=#d6d6d6
| 351922 ||  || — || September 30, 2006 || Apache Point || A. C. Becker || — || align=right | 2.8 km || 
|-id=923 bgcolor=#d6d6d6
| 351923 ||  || — || September 30, 2006 || Apache Point || A. C. Becker || — || align=right | 4.3 km || 
|-id=924 bgcolor=#d6d6d6
| 351924 ||  || — || September 30, 2006 || Mount Lemmon || Mount Lemmon Survey || — || align=right | 2.1 km || 
|-id=925 bgcolor=#d6d6d6
| 351925 ||  || — || September 28, 2006 || Mount Lemmon || Mount Lemmon Survey || — || align=right | 3.4 km || 
|-id=926 bgcolor=#d6d6d6
| 351926 ||  || — || September 30, 2006 || Mount Lemmon || Mount Lemmon Survey || THM || align=right | 1.9 km || 
|-id=927 bgcolor=#d6d6d6
| 351927 ||  || — || September 17, 2006 || Catalina || CSS || — || align=right | 3.1 km || 
|-id=928 bgcolor=#d6d6d6
| 351928 ||  || — || September 27, 2006 || Catalina || CSS || — || align=right | 2.6 km || 
|-id=929 bgcolor=#d6d6d6
| 351929 ||  || — || October 11, 2006 || Kitt Peak || Spacewatch || — || align=right | 2.7 km || 
|-id=930 bgcolor=#d6d6d6
| 351930 ||  || — || October 12, 2006 || Kitt Peak || Spacewatch || — || align=right | 3.9 km || 
|-id=931 bgcolor=#d6d6d6
| 351931 ||  || — || October 12, 2006 || Kitt Peak || Spacewatch || EOS || align=right | 2.4 km || 
|-id=932 bgcolor=#d6d6d6
| 351932 ||  || — || September 30, 2006 || Mount Lemmon || Mount Lemmon Survey || — || align=right | 2.6 km || 
|-id=933 bgcolor=#d6d6d6
| 351933 ||  || — || October 12, 2006 || Kitt Peak || Spacewatch || — || align=right | 2.4 km || 
|-id=934 bgcolor=#d6d6d6
| 351934 ||  || — || October 12, 2006 || Kitt Peak || Spacewatch || — || align=right | 2.4 km || 
|-id=935 bgcolor=#d6d6d6
| 351935 ||  || — || April 12, 2004 || Kitt Peak || Spacewatch || — || align=right | 2.3 km || 
|-id=936 bgcolor=#d6d6d6
| 351936 ||  || — || October 12, 2006 || Kitt Peak || Spacewatch || VER || align=right | 2.5 km || 
|-id=937 bgcolor=#d6d6d6
| 351937 ||  || — || September 27, 2006 || Mount Lemmon || Mount Lemmon Survey || — || align=right | 3.0 km || 
|-id=938 bgcolor=#d6d6d6
| 351938 ||  || — || October 12, 2006 || Kitt Peak || Spacewatch || EOS || align=right | 2.0 km || 
|-id=939 bgcolor=#d6d6d6
| 351939 ||  || — || October 12, 2006 || Kitt Peak || Spacewatch || THM || align=right | 2.4 km || 
|-id=940 bgcolor=#d6d6d6
| 351940 ||  || — || October 12, 2006 || Kitt Peak || Spacewatch || — || align=right | 3.7 km || 
|-id=941 bgcolor=#d6d6d6
| 351941 ||  || — || October 12, 2006 || Kitt Peak || Spacewatch || — || align=right | 3.4 km || 
|-id=942 bgcolor=#d6d6d6
| 351942 ||  || — || October 13, 2006 || Kitt Peak || Spacewatch || EUP || align=right | 4.2 km || 
|-id=943 bgcolor=#d6d6d6
| 351943 ||  || — || September 18, 2006 || Kitt Peak || Spacewatch || — || align=right | 2.8 km || 
|-id=944 bgcolor=#d6d6d6
| 351944 ||  || — || October 11, 2006 || Palomar || NEAT || — || align=right | 2.9 km || 
|-id=945 bgcolor=#d6d6d6
| 351945 ||  || — || October 2, 2006 || Catalina || CSS || TIR || align=right | 3.5 km || 
|-id=946 bgcolor=#d6d6d6
| 351946 ||  || — || October 13, 2006 || Kitt Peak || Spacewatch || — || align=right | 2.9 km || 
|-id=947 bgcolor=#d6d6d6
| 351947 ||  || — || October 13, 2006 || Kitt Peak || Spacewatch || — || align=right | 2.8 km || 
|-id=948 bgcolor=#d6d6d6
| 351948 ||  || — || October 13, 2006 || Kitt Peak || Spacewatch || URS || align=right | 4.0 km || 
|-id=949 bgcolor=#d6d6d6
| 351949 ||  || — || October 13, 2006 || Kitt Peak || Spacewatch || EOS || align=right | 2.1 km || 
|-id=950 bgcolor=#d6d6d6
| 351950 ||  || — || October 13, 2006 || Kitt Peak || Spacewatch || — || align=right | 3.0 km || 
|-id=951 bgcolor=#d6d6d6
| 351951 ||  || — || October 2, 2006 || Mount Lemmon || Mount Lemmon Survey || — || align=right | 2.7 km || 
|-id=952 bgcolor=#d6d6d6
| 351952 ||  || — || October 4, 2006 || Mount Lemmon || Mount Lemmon Survey || — || align=right | 3.3 km || 
|-id=953 bgcolor=#d6d6d6
| 351953 ||  || — || October 13, 2006 || Kitt Peak || Spacewatch || EOS || align=right | 6.1 km || 
|-id=954 bgcolor=#d6d6d6
| 351954 ||  || — || October 13, 2006 || Kitt Peak || Spacewatch || — || align=right | 2.5 km || 
|-id=955 bgcolor=#d6d6d6
| 351955 ||  || — || October 12, 2006 || Kitt Peak || Spacewatch || — || align=right | 3.2 km || 
|-id=956 bgcolor=#d6d6d6
| 351956 ||  || — || October 1, 2006 || Kitt Peak || Spacewatch || — || align=right | 3.8 km || 
|-id=957 bgcolor=#d6d6d6
| 351957 ||  || — || September 28, 2006 || Mount Lemmon || Mount Lemmon Survey || EOS || align=right | 2.3 km || 
|-id=958 bgcolor=#d6d6d6
| 351958 ||  || — || October 1, 2006 || Apache Point || A. C. Becker || — || align=right | 3.3 km || 
|-id=959 bgcolor=#d6d6d6
| 351959 ||  || — || October 1, 2006 || Apache Point || A. C. Becker || — || align=right | 2.7 km || 
|-id=960 bgcolor=#d6d6d6
| 351960 ||  || — || October 1, 2006 || Apache Point || A. C. Becker || — || align=right | 2.8 km || 
|-id=961 bgcolor=#d6d6d6
| 351961 ||  || — || October 3, 2006 || Apache Point || A. C. Becker || — || align=right | 4.8 km || 
|-id=962 bgcolor=#d6d6d6
| 351962 ||  || — || October 12, 2006 || Kitt Peak || Spacewatch || — || align=right | 2.9 km || 
|-id=963 bgcolor=#d6d6d6
| 351963 ||  || — || October 1, 2006 || Kitt Peak || Spacewatch || — || align=right | 2.2 km || 
|-id=964 bgcolor=#d6d6d6
| 351964 ||  || — || October 12, 2006 || Palomar || NEAT || — || align=right | 2.3 km || 
|-id=965 bgcolor=#d6d6d6
| 351965 ||  || — || October 16, 2006 || Kitt Peak || Spacewatch || THM || align=right | 2.2 km || 
|-id=966 bgcolor=#d6d6d6
| 351966 ||  || — || October 16, 2006 || Catalina || CSS || — || align=right | 2.8 km || 
|-id=967 bgcolor=#d6d6d6
| 351967 ||  || — || October 16, 2006 || Catalina || CSS || VER || align=right | 3.4 km || 
|-id=968 bgcolor=#d6d6d6
| 351968 ||  || — || October 17, 2006 || Mount Lemmon || Mount Lemmon Survey || — || align=right | 2.6 km || 
|-id=969 bgcolor=#d6d6d6
| 351969 ||  || — || October 17, 2006 || Mount Lemmon || Mount Lemmon Survey || EOS || align=right | 2.1 km || 
|-id=970 bgcolor=#d6d6d6
| 351970 ||  || — || October 16, 2006 || Kitt Peak || Spacewatch || — || align=right | 2.5 km || 
|-id=971 bgcolor=#d6d6d6
| 351971 ||  || — || October 16, 2006 || Kitt Peak || Spacewatch || — || align=right | 2.4 km || 
|-id=972 bgcolor=#d6d6d6
| 351972 ||  || — || October 16, 2006 || Kitt Peak || Spacewatch || — || align=right | 6.1 km || 
|-id=973 bgcolor=#d6d6d6
| 351973 ||  || — || September 25, 2006 || Mount Lemmon || Mount Lemmon Survey || — || align=right | 3.2 km || 
|-id=974 bgcolor=#d6d6d6
| 351974 ||  || — || September 19, 2006 || Catalina || CSS || EOS || align=right | 2.3 km || 
|-id=975 bgcolor=#d6d6d6
| 351975 ||  || — || August 29, 2006 || Catalina || CSS || — || align=right | 2.9 km || 
|-id=976 bgcolor=#d6d6d6
| 351976 Borromini ||  ||  || October 23, 2006 || Vallemare di Borbona || V. S. Casulli || — || align=right | 2.9 km || 
|-id=977 bgcolor=#fefefe
| 351977 ||  || — || October 17, 1995 || Kitt Peak || Spacewatch || — || align=right data-sort-value="0.78" | 780 m || 
|-id=978 bgcolor=#d6d6d6
| 351978 ||  || — || October 17, 2006 || Kitt Peak || Spacewatch || — || align=right | 2.6 km || 
|-id=979 bgcolor=#d6d6d6
| 351979 ||  || — || October 17, 2006 || Mount Lemmon || Mount Lemmon Survey || — || align=right | 2.6 km || 
|-id=980 bgcolor=#E9E9E9
| 351980 ||  || — || October 18, 2006 || Kitt Peak || Spacewatch || — || align=right | 2.5 km || 
|-id=981 bgcolor=#d6d6d6
| 351981 ||  || — || October 18, 2006 || Kitt Peak || Spacewatch || — || align=right | 2.3 km || 
|-id=982 bgcolor=#d6d6d6
| 351982 ||  || — || October 18, 2006 || Kitt Peak || Spacewatch || — || align=right | 2.7 km || 
|-id=983 bgcolor=#d6d6d6
| 351983 ||  || — || October 18, 2006 || Kitt Peak || Spacewatch || — || align=right | 3.8 km || 
|-id=984 bgcolor=#d6d6d6
| 351984 ||  || — || October 19, 2006 || Kitt Peak || Spacewatch || EOS || align=right | 1.7 km || 
|-id=985 bgcolor=#d6d6d6
| 351985 ||  || — || October 2, 2006 || Mount Lemmon || Mount Lemmon Survey || — || align=right | 3.1 km || 
|-id=986 bgcolor=#d6d6d6
| 351986 ||  || — || October 19, 2006 || Kitt Peak || Spacewatch || — || align=right | 3.1 km || 
|-id=987 bgcolor=#d6d6d6
| 351987 ||  || — || October 4, 2006 || Mount Lemmon || Mount Lemmon Survey || EOS || align=right | 2.1 km || 
|-id=988 bgcolor=#d6d6d6
| 351988 ||  || — || October 21, 2006 || Mount Lemmon || Mount Lemmon Survey || — || align=right | 3.6 km || 
|-id=989 bgcolor=#d6d6d6
| 351989 ||  || — || October 16, 2006 || Catalina || CSS || HYG || align=right | 3.4 km || 
|-id=990 bgcolor=#d6d6d6
| 351990 ||  || — || October 16, 2006 || Catalina || CSS || — || align=right | 3.2 km || 
|-id=991 bgcolor=#d6d6d6
| 351991 ||  || — || September 28, 2006 || Catalina || CSS || — || align=right | 4.0 km || 
|-id=992 bgcolor=#d6d6d6
| 351992 ||  || — || October 19, 2006 || Catalina || CSS || — || align=right | 3.1 km || 
|-id=993 bgcolor=#d6d6d6
| 351993 ||  || — || October 19, 2006 || Catalina || CSS || — || align=right | 3.0 km || 
|-id=994 bgcolor=#d6d6d6
| 351994 ||  || — || October 19, 2006 || Catalina || CSS || — || align=right | 2.7 km || 
|-id=995 bgcolor=#d6d6d6
| 351995 ||  || — || October 19, 2006 || Catalina || CSS || EOS || align=right | 3.1 km || 
|-id=996 bgcolor=#d6d6d6
| 351996 ||  || — || October 19, 2006 || Catalina || CSS || — || align=right | 3.4 km || 
|-id=997 bgcolor=#d6d6d6
| 351997 ||  || — || October 20, 2006 || Kitt Peak || Spacewatch || — || align=right | 2.4 km || 
|-id=998 bgcolor=#d6d6d6
| 351998 ||  || — || October 22, 2006 || Palomar || NEAT || — || align=right | 3.5 km || 
|-id=999 bgcolor=#d6d6d6
| 351999 ||  || — || October 23, 2006 || Kitt Peak || Spacewatch || EOS || align=right | 2.2 km || 
|-id=000 bgcolor=#d6d6d6
| 352000 ||  || — || October 23, 2006 || Kitt Peak || Spacewatch || VER || align=right | 3.7 km || 
|}

References

External links 
 Discovery Circumstances: Numbered Minor Planets (350001)–(355000) (IAU Minor Planet Center)

0351